This is a list of wars and conflicts in Asia, particularly East Asia, South Asia, Southeast Asia and Russia. For a list of conflicts in Southwest Asia, Asia Pacific. see List of conflicts in the Near East for historical conflicts and List of conflicts in the Middle East, List of conflicts in Australia (related Asia Pacific) for contemporary conflicts

Western Asia

Armenia
 c. 2492 BCE Battle between Haik and Nimrod
 714 BCE Urartu–Assyria War
 1914-1918 World War I
 1918 Georgian–Armenian War
 1918–1920 Armenian–Azerbaijani War
 1920 Red Army invasion of Armenia
 1988-ongoing Nagorno-Karabakh conflict
 1988-1994 First Nagorno-Karabakh War
 2008 2008 Mardakert clashes
 2010 2010 Nagorno-Karabakh clashes
 2010 2010 Mardakert clashes
 2012 2012 Armenian–Azerbaijani border clashes
 2014 2014 Armenian–Azerbaijani clashes
 2014 2014 Armenian Mil Mi-24 shootdown
 2016 2016 Nagorno-Karabakh conflict
 2018 2018 Armenian–Azerbaijani clashes
 2020 July 2020 Armenian–Azerbaijani clashes
 2020 2020 Nagorno-Karabakh war
 2021-2022 2021–2022 Armenia–Azerbaijan border crisis

Azerbaijan 

 1914–1918 Caucasus Campaign of World War I
 1918–1919 Mughan clashes
 1918–1920 Armenian–Azerbaijani War
 1920 Red Army invasion of Azerbaijan
 1988-ongoing Nagorno-Karabakh conflict
 1988-1994 First Nagorno-Karabakh War
 2008 2008 Mardakert clashes
 2010 2010 Nagorno-Karabakh clashes
 2010 2010 Mardakert clashes
 2012 2012 Armenian–Azerbaijani border clashes
 2014 2014 Armenian–Azerbaijani clashes
 2014 2014 Armenian Mil Mi-24 shootdown
 2016 2016 Nagorno-Karabakh conflict
 2018 2018 Armenian–Azerbaijani clashes
 2020 July 2020 Armenian–Azerbaijani clashes
 2020 2020 Nagorno-Karabakh war
 2021-2022 2021–2022 Armenia–Azerbaijan border crisis

Egypt

Prehistoric Egypt 
 Between 14340 to 13140 BCE Battle at Cemetery 117

Early Dynastic Period 
 c. 3100 BCE Unification of Upper and Lower Egypt
 c. 3050 BCE Hor-Aha, the second pharaoh of Egypt, led a campaign against the Nubians.
 c. 2890 BCE After the death of Qa'a, the last pharaoh of the First Dynasty of Egypt, a short war may have occurred for the throne, ending with the accession of Hotepsekhemwy.
 c. 2690 BCE Khasekhemwy reunited Upper Egypt and Lower Egypt

Old Kingdom 
 c. 2670 BCE Djoser, the first pharaoh of the Third Dynasty of Egypt dispatched several military expeditions to the Sinai Peninsula

First Intermediate Period 
 c. 2150 BCE The 4.2 kiloyear event triggered famines, social disorder, and fragmentation.
 c. 2140 BCE During the reign of the pharaoh Neferkare III, the nomarch of Hieraconopolis Ankhtifi, led a coalition of his nome and Edfu against Thebes.
 c. 2120 BCE Mentuhotep I and Sehertawy Intef I
 c. 2075 BCE Akhtoy Nebkaure sacked Thinis

Middle Kingdom 
 c. 2061 - c. 2010 BCE Campaigns of Mentuhotep II
 c. 1900 BCE Senusret I conquest of Lower Nubia
 c. 1880 BCE Amenemhat II, looted two cities in Asia
 c. 1860-1850 BCE Senusret III, four campaigns to Nubia, one campaign to the Southern Levant
 c. 1850 BCE Amenemhat III, short Nubian campaign
 c. 1705 BCE - c. 1648 BCE Continuation of 14th dynasty rule in the Nile River Delta region until 1650 BCE when the Hyksos Fifteenth Dynasty of Egypt conquered the Delta.

Second Intermediate Period 
 c. 1649 BCE - c. 1600 BCE the Hyksos progress south conquering Middle Egypt, then controlled by the Abydos Dynasty or the 16th Dynasty
 c. 1629 BCE - c. 1628 BCE Neferhotep III in a defensive war against the Hyksos Fifteenth Dynasty of Egypt
 c. 1582 BCE Final Theban offensive of Hyksos who conquer Thebes, ending the 16th Dynasty
 c. 1560 BCE - c. 1540 BCE The Seventeenth Dynasty of Egypt at war with the Hyksos

New Kingdom of Egypt 
 c. 1550 Pharaoh Ahmosis I launches an invasion on the Hyksos in Upper and Lower Egypt. A new era in Ancient Egyptian history: the New Kingdom under the rule of the 18th dynasty.
 c. 1282 BCE Seti's military campaigns
 1206 BCE - c. 1150 BCE Bronze Age collapse causes the collapse of the New Kingdom of Egypt and subsequent attacks from Libyans, with associated people of Ekwesh, Shekelesh, Lukka, Shardana, and Tursha. A second attack during the reign of Ramesses III involved Peleset, Tjeker, Shardana and Denyen.
 c. 1178 BCE Egyptian-Sea People wars
 c. 1178 BCE Battle of the Delta
 c. 1178 BCE Battle of Djahy

Third Intermediate Period 
 925 BCE Battle of Bitter Lakes
 752-721 BCE Conquest of Egypt
 671 BCE Assyrian invasion of Egypt led by Esarhaddon
 664 BCE Sack of Thebes led by Ashurbanipal

Late Period 
 530-522 BCE Campaigns of King Cambyses II of Persia
 525 BCE Battle of Pelusium
 522-520 BCE Rebellion of Petubastis III
 480s BCE Rebellion of Psamtik IV
 460-454 BCE Rebellion of Inaros II
 459 BCE Battle of Papremis
 411 BCE Amyrtaeus revolted against Darius II of the Achaemenid Empire and regained Egyptian independence
 385-383 BCE A Persian invasion of Egypt was repelled by King Hakor
 374-373 BCE A Persian invasion of Egypt was repelled by King Nectanebo I
 343 BCE Second Achaemenid conquest of Egypt
 335-323 BCE Wars of Alexander the Great
 333 BCE Pelusium opened its gates to Alexander the Great, who placed a garrison in it under the command of an officer entitled Companion of the King.

Ptolemaic Kingdom 
 173 BCE Antiochus Epiphanes defeated the troops of Ptolemy Philometor 
 55 BCE Mark Antony defeated the Egyptian army and made himself master of the city
 10 January 49 BCE - 17 March 45 BCE Caesar's Civil War
 48-47 BCE Siege of Alexandria
 47 BCE Battle of the Nile
 32 BCE - August 30 BCE Final War of the Roman Republic
 31 July - 1 August 30 BCE Battle of Alexandria

Roman Province of Egypt 
 115-117 CE Kitos War

Byzantine Diocese of Egypt 
 618-621 CE Sassanid conquest of Egypt
 619 CE Siege of Alexandria

Rashidun Caliphate 
 639-642 CE Muslim conquest of Egypt
 6 July 640 CE Battle of Heliopolis
 641 CE Siege of Alexandria
 646 CE Battle of Nikiou

Abbasid Caliphate 
 809-827 CE Great Abbasid Civil War

Ayyubid Dynasty 
 1171-1172 CE Ayyubids Conquest of North Africa and Nubia
 1095-1272 CE The Crusades
 1213-1221 CE Fifth Crusade
 1218-1219 CE Siege of Damietta
 29 August 1219 CE Battle of Fariskur
 1248-1254 CE Seventh Crusade
 6 June 1249 CE Siege of Damietta
 8 February 1250 CE - 11 February 1250 CE Battle of Al Mansurah
 6 April 1250 CE Battle of Fariskur

Mamluk Sultanate of Egypt 
 9–12 October 1365 CE Alexandrian Crusade

Eyalet of Egypt 
 1538-1557 CE Ottoman-Portuguese conflicts
 20 April 1792 - 25 March 1802 CE French Revolutionary Wars
 May–December 1798 CE Mediterranean campaign
 1798-1801 CE French campaign in Egypt and Syria
 13 July 1798 CE Battle of Shubra Khit
 21 July 1798 CE Battle of the Pyramids
 1–3 August 1798 CE Battle of the Nile
 21 October 1798 Revolt of Cairo
 25 July 1799 CE Battle of Abukir
 19 February 1799 CE Siege of El Arish
 20 March 1800 CE Battle of Heliopolis
 8 March 1801 CE Battle of Abukir
 13 March 1801 CE Battle of Mandora
 21 March 1801 CE Battle of Alexandria
 17 August - 2 September 1801 CE Siege of Alexandria
 18 May 1803 CE - 20 November 1815 CE Napoleonic Wars
 1807-1809 CE Anglo-Turkish War
 1807 CE Alexandria expedition

Khedivate of Egypt 
 1882 CE Anglo-Egyptian War
 11–13 July 1882 CE Bombardment of Alexandria
 June–July 1882 CE Egyptian Expedition
 1882 CE Battle of Kassassin
 1882 CE Battle of Kafr el-Dawwar
 13 September 1882 CE Battle of Tel al-Kebir
 1881-1899 CE Mahdist War
 3 August 1889 CE Battle of Toski

Sultanate of Egypt 
 28 July 1914 - 11 November 1918 World War I
 29 October 1914 - 30 October 1918 Middle Eastern theatre of World War I
 28 January 1915 - 30 October 1918 Sinai and Palestine Campaign
 26 January - 4 February 1915 Raid on the Suez Canal
 23 April 1916 Battle of Katia
 3–5 August 1916 Battle of Romani
 23 December 1916 Battle of Magdhaba
 9 January 1917 Battle of Rafa
 13–21 February 1917 Raid on Nekhl

Kingdom of Egypt 
 1 September 1939 - 2 September 1945 World War II
 10 June 1940 - 2 May 1945 Mediterranean and Middle East theatre of World War II
 10 June 1940 - 13 May 1943 North African Campaign
 11 June 1940 - 4 February 1943 Western Desert Campaign
 9–16 September 1940 Italian invasion of Egypt
 9 December 1940 - 9 February 1941 Operation Compass
 4 February 1942 Abdeen Palace Incident
 1–27 July 1942 First Battle of El Alamein
 30 August - 5 September 1942 Battle of Alam Halfa
 11 October - 23 November 1942 Second Battle of El Alamein
 15 May 1948 - 10 March 1949 Arab-Israeli War
 December 1948 - January 1949 Battles of the Sinai

Republic of Egypt 
 23 July 1952 Egyptian Revolution
 2–3 November 1955 Operation Volcano (Israeli raid)
 29 October - 7 November 1956 Suez Crisis
 October 1956 Operation Musketeer
 1956 Operation Telescope
 1956 Battle of Suez

Arab Republic of Egypt 
 5–11 June 1967 Six-Day War
 5–6 June 1967 Battle of Abu-Ageila
 8 June 1967 USS Liberty incident
 1 July 1967 - 7 August 1970 War of Attrition
 11 July 1967 Battle of Rumani Coast
 19 July 1969 Operation Bulmus 6
 20 July 1969 - 28 July 1969 Operation Boxer
 26–27 December 1969 Operation Rooster 53
 7 January - 13 April 1970 Operation Priha
 22 January 1970 Operation Rhodes
 30 July 1970 Operation Rimon 20
 6–25 October 1973 Yom Kipppur War
 6–8 October 1973 Operation Badr
 6 October 1973 Battles of Fort Budapest
 6 October 1973 Battle of Fort Lahtzanit
 6 October 1973 Ofira Air Battle
 6–7 October 1973 Battle of El Qantarah
 7 October 1973 Romani ambush
 7 October 1973 Battle of Marsa Talamat
 7 October 1973 Operation Tagar
 7–8 October 1973 Battle of the Moses Eyes Fortress
 8 October 1973 Battle of Firdan
 8–9 October 1973 Battle of Baltim
 14 October 1973 Battle of the Sinai
 14 October 1973 Air Battle of El Mansoura
 15 October 1973 - 17 October 1973 Battle of the Chinese Farm
 16 October 1973 Raid on Egyptian missile bases
 17 October 1973 Egyptian 25th Brigade ambush
 18 October 1973 Battle of Ismailia
 22 October 1973 Scud missile attack
 24–25 October 1973 Battle of Suez
 21–24 July 1977 Libyan-Egyptian War
 25 January 2011 2011 Egyptian Revolution and Aftermath
 23 February 2011 - ongoing Sinai insurgency
 22 November 2012 - 3 July 2013 Egyptian protests
 3 July 2013 Political violence in Egypt
 16 February 2015 - ongoing Intervention in Libya
 25 March 2015 - ongoing Intervention in Yemen

Iran

Early Dynastic Period of Sumer
 c. 2800 BCE – c. 2500 BCE Gilgamesh of Uruk killed the Elamite ruler Humbaba
 c. 2500 BCE Enmebaragesi of Kish subdued Elam

Fourth Babylonian Dynasty
 c. 1125–1104 BCE (Short chronology) Nebuchadnezzar I of Isin's War with Elam

Achaemenid Empire
 559–530 BCE Campaigns of Cyrus the Great
 552 BCE Persian Revolt

 552 BCE Battle of Hyrba
 551 BCE Battle of the Persian Border
 550 BCE Battle of Pasargadae

Macedonian Empire
 335–323 BCE Wars of Alexander the Great
 January 20, 330 BCE Battle of the Persian Gate

Seleucid Empire
 322–275 BCE Wars of the Diadochi
 317 BCE Battle of Paraitacene
 Winter 316 BCE Battle of Gabiene

Parthian Empire
 238–129 BCE Seleucid–Parthian wars
 238 BCE Parni conquest of Parthia
 129 BCE Battle of Ecbatana
 66 BCE – 217 Roman–Parthian Wars
 40–33 BCE Antony's Parthian War
 161–166 Roman–Parthian War
 217 CE Battle of Nisibis

Sasanian Empire
 April 24, 224 Parthian–Sasanian War
 502–628 Byzantine–Sasanian wars
 440 Byzantine–Sasanian War
 572–591 Byzantine–Sasanian War
 August 591 Battle of Blarathon
 633–644 Muslim conquest of Persia
 642 Battle of Nahāvand

Rashidun Caliphate

 656–661 First Fitna

Umayyad Caliphate
 680–692 Second Fitna
 743–750 Third Fitna

Abbasid Caliphate
 809–827 Fourth Fitna

Qajar dynasty
 1911-1913 Revolt of Salar-al-Daulah
 1914-1918 World War I
 1914-1918 Persian Campaign

Pahlavi dynasty
 1918-ongoing Kurdish–Iranian conflict
 1918 Simko Shikak revolt
 1926 1926 Shikak revolt
 1929 Jafar Sultan revolt
 1941-1944 Hama Rashid revolt
 1945-1926 Iran crisis of 1946
 1967 1967 Kurdish revolt in Iran
 1922–2022 Arab separatism in Khuzestan
 1922–1924 Sheikh Khazal rebellion
 1939–1945 World War II
 1941 Anglo-Soviet invasion of Iran
 1963–1976 Dhofar Rebellion

Islamic Republic of Iran
 1979 Iranian Revolution
 1979-1983 Consolidation of the Iranian Revolution
 1979-1981 Iran Hostage Crisis
 1922–2022 Arab separatism in Khuzestan
 1979 1979 Khuzestan insurgency
 2005 2005 Ahvaz unrest
 2005–2006 2005-06 Ahvaz bombings
 2011 2011 Khuzestan protests
 2018 Ahvaz military parade attack
 1918–ongoing Kurdish–Iranian conflict
 1979 1979 Kurdish rebellion in Iran
 1984-1991 KDPI-Komala conflict
 1989-1996 KDPI insurgency (1989-96)
 2004-ongoing Iran-PJAK conflict 
 2014 Mahabad riots
 2016-ongoing Western Iran clashes (2016–present)
 1980–1989 Iran-Iraq War
 1948–ongoing  Balochistan conflict
 2004‐ongoing Sistan and Baluchestan insurgency

Iraq

Early Dynastic Period of Sumer
 c. 2800 BCE – c. 2500 BCE Gilgamesh of Uruk killed the Elamite ruler Humbaba
 c. 2500 BCE Enmebaragesi of Kish subdued Elam
 c. 2500 BCE Aga of Kish, the son of Enmebaragesi of Kish, besieged Uruk
 c. 2500 BCE Enmerkar of Uruk's year-long siege of Aratta
 c. 2500 BCE Dumuzid of Uruk captured Enmebaragesi of Kish single-handed
 c. 2500 BCE Enshakushanna of Uruk conquered Hamazi, Akkad, Kish, and Nippur, claiming hegemony over all of Sumer. Enshakushanna was succeeded in Uruk by Lugal-kinishe-dudu, but the hegemony seems to have passed to Eannatum of Lagash for a time
 c. 2500 BCE Eannatum of Lagash conquered all of Sumer, including Ur, Nippur, Akshak, Larsa, and Uruk (controlled by Enshakushanna)
 c. 2500 BCE En-anna-tum I of Lagash succeeded his brother Eannatum and defended Lagash against Ur-Lumma of Umma
 c. 2500 BCE Entemena of Lagash succeeded his father En-anna-tum I and re-established Lagash as a power in Sumer. He defeated Illi of Umma, with the aid of Lugal-kinishe-dudu of Uruk (the successor to Enshakushanna)
 c. 2500 BCE Lugal-Anne-Mundu of Adab subjected the "Four Quarters" of the world – i.e., the entire Fertile Crescent region, from the Mediterranean to the Zagros Mountains
 c. 2295–2271 BCE (Short chronology) Lugal-zage-si of Umma conquered several of the Sumerian city-states – including Kish, where he overthrew Ur-Zababa; Lagash, where he overthrew Urukagina; Ur, Nippur, and Larsa; as well as Uruk

Akkadian Empire
 c. 2270–2215 BCE (Short chronology) Conquests of Sargon of Akkad

 2270 BCE Battle of Uruk
 Syria and Canaan campaigns
 Akkadian conquest of Ebla
 Magan revolt
 c. 2214–2206 BCE (Short chronology) Rimush of Akkad faced widespread revolts which he successfully suppressed and launched a victorious campaign against Elam and Marhasi
 c. 2205–2191 BCE (Short chronology) Manishtushu of Akkad conquered the city of Shirasum in Elam
 c. 2190–2115 BCE (Short chronology) Naram-Sin of Akkad conquered the Lullubi and Majan
 c. 2115–2090 BCE (Short chronology) Shar-Kali-Sharri of Akkad launched successful campaigns against Gutium, Amurru, and Elam, among other places
 c. 2090–2087 BCE (Short chronology) After Shar-Kali-Sharri's reign, there may have been a short period of crisis or struggle between Igigi, Imi, Nanum, Ilulu
 c. 2087–2066 BCE (Short chronology) Dudu of Akkad ended the period of relative anarchy
 c. 2066–2051 BCE (Short chronology) Akkad was conquered during the reign of Shu-turul

Gutian period of Sumer
 c. 2002 BCE (Short chronology) Gutian attacks on the Akkadian Empire

Fifth Dynasty of Uruk
 1945–1906 BCE Ilu-shuma of Assyria made many raids into southern Mesopotamia
 c. 1886–1879 BCE (Short chronology) After defeating the Gutian with the aid of other cities, Utu-hengal of Uruk established himself as the king of Sumer
 c. 1886 BCE (Short chronology) Defeat of Tirigan, the last Gutian ruler in Sumer

Neo-Sumerian Empire

 c. 1879–1861 BCE (Short chronology) Ur-Nammu of Ur conquered Lagash
 c. 1861–1815 BCE (Short chronology) Shulgi of Ur destroyed Der, launched a campaign against Anshan, and engaged in a period of expansionism at the expense of highlanders such as the Lullubi, and others
 c. 1830–1817 BCE (Short chronology) The Amorite chieftain Sumu-abum won independence from the city-state Kazallu
 c. 1815–1809 BCE (Short chronology) Amar-Sin of Ur launched campaigns conducted against Urbilum, and several other regions with obscure names: Shashrum, Shurudhum, Bitum-Rabium, Jabru, and Huhnuri
 c. 1813–1791 BCE Shamshi-Adad I conquered Assur, Mari, Ekallatum, and Shekhna, establishing an empire encompassing the whole of northern Mesopotamia and included territory in central Mesopotamia, Asia Minor and northern Syria
 c. 1800–1776 BCE (Short chronology) During the reign of Ibbi-Sin of Ur, the Sumerian empire was attacked repeatedly by Amorites and as faith in Ibbi-Sin's leadership failed, Elam declared its independence and began to raid as well
 c. 1776 BCE (Short chronology) Elamite Sack of Ur

Dynasty of Isin
 c. 1766 BCE (Short chronology) Ishbi-Erra of Isin reconquered much of the former heartland of Sumer and Akkad from Elam and various invaders

Paleo-Babylonian Empire
 c. 1752–1730 BCE (Short chronology) Damiq-ilishu of Isin, the last king on the Sumerian King List, is defeated by Sin-Muballit of Babylon
 c. 1728–1686 BCE (Short chronology) Hammurabi of Babylon extended Babylon's control over Mesopotamia by winning a series of wars against neighboring kingdoms
 c. 1720 BCE Puzur-Sin, an Assyrian vice regent drove out Asinum the Amorite vassal king of the Babylonians from Assyria, allowing the native Ashur-dugul to seize the throne and subsequently triggering a civil war which ended Babylonian and Amorite influence in Assyria by 1720 BCE

Kassite period of Babylonia
 c. 1531 BCE (Short chronology) Fall of Babylon
 c. 1507 BCE (Short chronology) Kassite attacks on Babylon

 c. 1232–1225 BCE (Short chronology) Tukulti-Ninurta I of Assyria defeated Kashtiliash IV, the Kassite king of Babylon and captured the city of Babylon to ensure full Assyrian supremacy over Mesopotamia
 c. 1157–1155 BCE (Short chronology) Enlil-nadin-ahi, the final king of the Kassite dynasty that had ruled over Babylon, was defeated by Kutir-Nahhunte of Elam, the successor of Shutruk-Nakhunte

Fourth Babylonian Dynasty
 c. 1125–1104 BCE (Short chronology) Nebuchadnezzar I of Isin's War with Elam

Meso-Assyrian Empire
 1114–1076 BCE Tiglath-Pileser I of Assyria launched campaigns against the Mushki, the Hittites, and the Arameans
 c. 1074 BCE In the first year of the reign of the 89th Assyrian king Ashur-bel-kala, son of Tiglath-Pileser I, Ashur-bel-kala campaigned in the north against the Kingdom of Urartu

Neo-Assyrian Empire
 911–605 BCE Campaigns of the Neo-Assyrian Empire
 883–859 BCE Campaigns of Ashurnasirpal II
 859–824 BCE Campaigns of Shalmaneser III

 745–727 BCE Campaigns of Tiglath-Pileser III
 722–705 BCE Campaigns of Sargon II
 710 BCE Campaign against Babylonia
 705–681 BCE Campaigns of Sennacherib
 703–689 BCE War with Babylon
 693 BCE Battle of Diyala River
 693 BCE Siege of Babylon
 681–669 BCE Campaigns of Esarhaddon
 668–627 BCE Campaigns of Ashurbanipal
 627–624 BCE Campaigns of Ashur-etil-ilani
 626 BCE Revolt of Babylon
 616 BCE Battle of Arrapha
 627–624 BCE Campaigns of Sinsharishkun
 626–619 BCE Last Strike against Babylon
 616–605 BCE War in the Assyrian heartlands
 614 BCE Fall of Assur
 612 BCE Assur is sacked and largely destroyed during the conquest of Assyria by the Babylonians
 612 BCE Battle of Nineveh
 627–624 BCE Campaigns of Sinsharishkun
 612–609 BCE Campaigns of Ashur-uballit II
 610 BCE Harran was besieged and conquered by Nabopolassar and Cyaxares
 609 BCE Harran was briefly retaken by Ashur-uballit II and his Egyptian allies before it definitely fell to the Median Empire and Neo-Babylonian Empire
 Egyptian-Babylonian wars
 605 BCE Battle of Carchemish

Neo-Babylonian Empire

 627–624 BCE Campaigns of Ashur-etil-ilani
 626 BCE Revolt of Babylon
 616 BCE Battle of Arrapha
 627–624 BCE Campaigns of Sinsharishkun
 626–619 BCE Last Strike against Babylon
 616–605 BCE War in the Assyrian heartlands
 614 BCE Fall of Assur
 612 BCE Assur is sacked and largely destroyed during the conquest of Assyria by the Babylonians
 612 BCE Battle of Nineveh
 627–624 BCE Campaigns of Sinsharishkun
 612–609 BCE Campaigns of Ashur-uballit II
 610 BCE Harran was besieged and conquered by Nabopolassar and Cyaxares
 609 BCE Harran was briefly retaken by Ashur-uballit II and his Egyptian allies before it definitely fell to the Median Empire and Neo-Babylonian Empire
 Egyptian-Babylonian wars
 605 BCE Battle of Carchemish

Achaemenid Province of Athura
 559–530 BCE Campaigns of Cyrus the Great
 September 25, 539 BCE – September 28, 539 BCE Battle of Opis
 October 29, 539 BCE Capture of Babylon

Macedonian Empire
 335–323 BCE Wars of Alexander the Great

 October 1, 331 BCE Battle of Gaugamela

Seleucid Empire
 322–275 BCE Wars of the Diadochi
 311–309 BCE Babylonian War

Parthian Empire
 238–129 BCE Seleucid–Parthian wars
 238 BCE Parni conquest of Parthia
 129 BCE Battle of Ecbatana

Roman Province of Mesopotamia

 92 BCE – 629 CE Roman–Persian Wars
 198 CE Battle of Ctesiphon
 243 CE Battle of Resaena
 66 BCE – 217 CE Roman–Parthian Wars
 40–33 BCE Antony's Parthian War
 161–166 Roman–Parthian War
 216–217 Parthian war of Caracalla
 217 CE Battle of Nisibis

Sasanian Province of Asorestan
 217–502 Roman–Sasanian wars
 Winter of 244 Battle of Misiche
 253 Battle of Barbalissos
 260 Battle of Edessa
 264 Battle of Ctesiphon
 344 Battle of Satala
 359 Siege of Singara
 359 Siege of Amida
 April 27–29, 363 Siege of Pirisabora
 May 29, 363 Battle of Ctesiphon
 June 363 Battle of Samarra

 c. 240–272 Assur is destroyed by the Sasanian king Shapur I
 502–628 Byzantine–Sasanian wars
 502–506 Anastasian War
 526–532 Iberian War
 572–591 Byzantine–Sasanian War
 c. 602 – c. 628 Byzantine–Sasanian War
 633–644 Muslim conquest of Persia

 April 633 Battle of River
 May 633 Battle of Walaja
 May 633 Battle of Ullais
 May 633 Battle of Hira
 633 Battle of Ayn al-Tamr
 November 633 Battle of Muzayyah
 November 633 Battle of Saniyy
 November 633 Battle of Zumail
 January 634 Battle of Firaz
 November 634 Battle of the Bridge
 November 16–19, 636 Battle of al-Qādisiyyah
 January–March 637 Siege of Ctesiphon
 April 637 Battle of Jalula

Rashidun Caliphate
 633–644 Muslim conquest of Persia

 April 633 Battle of River
 May 633 Battle of Walaja
 May 633 Battle of Ullais
 May 633 Battle of Hira
 633 Battle of Ayn al-Tamr
 November 633 Battle of Muzayyah
 November 633 Battle of Saniyy
 November 633 Battle of Zumail
 January 634 Battle of Firaz
 November 634 Battle of the Bridge
 November 16–19, 636 Battle of al-Qādisiyyah
 January–March 637 Siege of Ctesiphon
 April 637 Battle of Jalula
 656–661 First Fitna
 656 Battle of the Camel
 659 Battle of Nahrawan

Umayyad Caliphate
 680–692 Second Fitna
 October 10, 680 Battle of Karbala
 692 Battle of Maskin
 743–750 Third Fitna

 January 25, 750 Battle of the Zab

Abbasid Caliphate
 September 762 – February 763 Alid Revolt
 809–827 Fourth Fitna
 812–813 Siege of Baghdad
 861–870 Anarchy at Samarra
 946 Battle of Baghdad
 1157 Siege of Baghdad

Mongol Empire
 1258 Siege of Baghdad

 1370–1405 Assyrian people are massacred at Assur by Timur

Ottoman Iraq
 1532–1555 Ottoman–Safavid War
 1534 Capture of Baghdad
 1623–1639 Ottoman–Safavid War
 1623 Capture of Baghdad
 1638 Capture of Baghdad
 July 28, 1914 – November 11, 1918 World War I
 October 29, 1914 – October 30, 1918 Middle Eastern theatre of World War I
 November 6, 1914 – November 14, 1918 Mesopotamian campaign
 November 6, 1914 Fao Landing
 November 11–21, 1914 Battle of Basra
 December 3–9, 1914 Battle of Qurna
 April 12–14, 1915 Battle of Shaiba

 September 28, 1915 Battle of Es Sinn
 November 22–25, 1915 Battle of Ctesiphon
 December 7, 1915 – April 29, 1916 Siege of Kut
 January 6–8, 1916 Battle of Sheikh Sa'ad
 January 13, 1916 Battle of Wadi
 January 21, 1916 Battle of Hanna
 March 8, 1916 Battle of Dujaila
 March 8–11, 1917 Fall of Baghdad
 February 23, 1917 Second Battle of Kut
 March 13 – April 23, 1917 Samarra offensive
 September 28–29, 1917 Battle of Ramadi
 March 26–27, 1918 Action of Khan Baghdadi
 October 23–30, 1918 Battle of Sharqat

Occupied Enemy Territory Administration
 May–October 1920 Iraqi revolt against the British

Kingdom of Iraq
 1935-1935 1935–1936 Iraqi Shia revolts
 1939-September 2, 1945 World War II
 1940-1945 Mediterranean and Middle East theatre of World War II
 1941 Anglo-Iraqi War
 1941 Iraq coup d'état
 1918-2003 Iraqi-Kurdish conflict
 1922-1924 Mahmud Barzanji revolts
 1931-1932 Ahmed Barzani revolt
 1943-1945 1943 Barzani revolt
 1958 14 July Revolution

First Iraqi Republic
 1959 1959 Mosul uprising
 1918-2003 Iraqi–Kurdish conflict
 1961-1970 First Iraqi–Kurdish War
 1963 Ramadan Revolution

Ba'athist Iraq
 1918–2003 Iraqi–Kurdish conflict
 September 11, 1961 – 1970 First Iraqi–Kurdish War
 April 1974 – Mid 1975 Second Iraqi–Kurdish War
 1975–1983 PUK insurgency
 September 1983 – September 1988 Kurdish Rebellion
 May 1994 – November 24, 1997 Iraqi Kurdish Civil War
 September 22, 1980 – August 20, 1988 Iran–Iraq War
 1980 Iraqi invasion
 September 23, 1980 Operation Kaman 99
 October 29, 1980 Operation Sultan 10
 September 30, 1980 Operation Scorch Sword
 November 28–29, 1980 Operation Morvarid
 1981 Stalemate
 April 4, 1981 Attack on H3
 1982 Iranian offensive
 Early July 1982 Operation Ramadan
 1983–85 Strategic stalemate
 February 6–26, 1983 Operation Before the Dawn
 April 10, 1983 Operation Dawn 1
 July 22, 1983 Operation Dawn 2
 July 30 – August 9, 1983 Operation Dawn 3
 October 19 – mid November, 1983 Operation Dawn 4
 Early 1984 Operation Dawn 5
 February 14 – March 19, 1984 Operation Kheibar
 February 22–24, 1984 Operation Dawn 6
 1984 Battle of the Marshes
 March 10–20, 1985 Operation Badr
 1986–87 Duel offensives
 1986–89 Al-Anfal Campaign
 March 16, 1988 Halabja poison gas attack
 February 9–25, 1986 Operation Dawn 8
 February 11, 1986 First Battle of al-Faw
 December 25–27, 1986 Operation Karbala-4
 January 8 – February 26, 1987 Operation Karbala-5
 Early 1987 Operation Karbala-6
 May 1987 Operation Karbala 10
 May – early June 1987 Operation Nasr 4
 1988 Final stages
 Mid-March 1988 Operation Zafar 7
 April 17, 1988 Second Battle of al-Faw
 1981 International incidents
 June 7, 1981 Operation Opera
 August 2, 1990 – February 28, 1991 Second Persian Gulf War
 1991 Operation Desert Storm
 February 15–20, 1991 Battle of Wadi al-Batin
 January 17 – February 23, 1991 Gulf War air campaign
 January 19, 1991 Package Q Strike
 February 13, 1991 4:30 am (GMT+3) Amiriyah shelter bombing
 February 24–28, 1991 Liberation of Kuwait campaign
 February 26–27, 1991 Battle of 73 Easting
 February 26, 1991 Battle of Phase Line Bullet
 February 27, 1991 Battle of Medina Ridge
 February 27, 1991 Battle for Jalibah Airfield
 February 27, 1991 Battle of Norfolk
 March 2, 1991 Battle of Rumaila
 March 1, 1991 Safwan Airfield Standoff
 March 1 – April 5, 1991 Uprisings in Iraq
 March 1 – mid-April 1991 Uprising in Basra
 March 5–19, 1991 Uprising in Karbala
 March 5 – April 3, 1991 Uprising in Sulaymaniyah
 March 11–29, 1991 Uprising in Kirkuk
 March 10–24, 1991 Uprising in Tuz Khormato
 1991–2002 Air engagements of the Post Gulf War
 March 20, 1991 – In accordance with the ceasefire, an F-15C shoots down an Iraqi Su-22 bomber with an AIM-9 missile.
 March 22, 1991 – In accordance with the ceasefire, an F-15C shoots down an Iraqi Su-22 bomber with an AIM-9 missile.
 December 27, 1992 – A MiG-25 crossed the no-fly zone and an F-16D shot it down with an AIM-120 AMRAAM missile. It is the first kill with an AIM-120.
 January 17, 1993 – A USAF F-16C shoots down a MiG-23 when the MiG locks the F-16 up.
 January 5, 1999 – A group of four Iraqi MiG-25s crossed the no-fly zones and sparked a dogfight with two patrolling F-15Cs and two patrolling F-14s. A total of six missiles were fired at the MiGs, none of which hit them. The MiGs then bugged out using their superior speed.
 September 9, 1999 – A lone MiG-23 crossed the no-fly zone heading towards a flight of F-14s. One F-14 fired an AIM-54 Phoenix at the MiG but missed and the MiG headed back north.
 December 23, 2002 – In what was the last aerial victory for the Iraqi Air Force before the Invasion of Iraq, an Iraqi MiG-25 destroyed an American UAV RQ-1 Predator after the drone opened fire on the Iraqi aircraft with a Stinger missile.
 September 3, 1996 Operation Desert Strike
 December 16–19, 1998 Operation Desert Fox
 March 20, 2003 – December 15, 2011 Third Persian Gulf War

 March 19 – May 1, 2003 Invasion of Iraq
 March 21–25, 2003 Battle of Umm Qasr
 March 20–24, 2003 Battle of Al Faw
 March 21 – April 6, 2003 Battle of Basra
 March 23–29, 2003 Battle of Nasiriyah
 March 24, 2003 Attack on Karbala
 March 24 – April 4, 2003 Battle of Najaf
 March 26, 2003 – Operation Northern Delay
 March 28–30, 2003 Operation Viking Hammer
 March 30 – April 4, 2003 Battle of Samawah
 March 31 – April 6, 2003 Battle of Karbala
 April 2–4, 2003 Battle of the Karbala Gap
 April 3–12, 2003 Battle of Baghdad
 April 6, 2003 Battle of Debecka Pass

Coalition Provisional Authority
 2003–2004 Post-invasion insurgency
 March 20, 2003 – December 7, 2011 Iraq War in Anbar Province
 October 26 – November 24, 2003 Ramadan Offensive
 December 13, 2003 Operation Red Dawn
 April 4 – June 24, 2004 Iraq spring fighting
 April 4 – May 1, 2004 First Battle of Fallujah
 April 4 – May 11, 2008 Siege of Sadr City
 April 6–10, 2004 Battle of Ramadi
 April 17, 2004 Battle of Husaybah
 August 5–27, 2004 Battle of Najaf
 August 5–28, 2004 CIMIC-House
 October 1–3, 2004 Battle of Samarra
 November 7 – December 23, 2004 Second Battle of Fallujah
 November 8–16, 2004 Battle of Mosul

Republic of Iraq
 2005–06 Post-invasion insurgency
 May 8–19, 2005 Battle of Al Qaim
 August 1–4, 2005 Battle of Haditha
 September 1–18, 2005 Battle of Tal Afar
 June 17 – November 15, 2006 Battle of Ramadi
 August 28, 2006 Battle of Diwaniya
 February 2006 – May 2008 Civil war in Iraq
 September 23 – October 22, 2006 Ramadan Offensive
 September 27, 2006 – February 18, 2007 Operation Sinbad
 October 19–20, 2006 Battle of Amarah
 November 15–16, 2006 Battle of Turki
 December 25, 2006 – October 1, 2007 Diyala campaign
 January 6–9, 2007 Battle of Haifa Street
 January 20, 2007 Karbala provincial headquarters raid
 January 28–29, 2007 Battle of Najaf
 February 14 – November 24, 2007 Operation Imposing Law
 February 27 – September 3, 2007 Siege of U.K. bases in Basra
 April 6–10, 2007 Operation Black Eagle
 June 16 – August 14, 2007 Operation Phantom Thunder
 March 10 – August 19, 2007 Battle of Baqubah
 June 30 – July 1, 2007 Battle of Donkey Island
 February 15, 2007 Operation Shurta Nasir
 August 27–29, 2007 Battle of Karbala
 January 8 – July 28, 2008 Operation Phantom Phoenix
 January 18–19, 2008 Iraqi Day of Ashura fighting
 January 23 – July 28, 2008 Ninawa campaign
 March 25 – May 15, 2008 Iraq spring fighting
 March 25–31, 2008 Battle of Basra
 April 15 – May 19, 2008 Al-Qaeda offensive in Iraq

Israel

Canaan
 c. 2061–2010 BCE Military activities in Canaan of the Pharaoh Mentuhotep II
 c. 2000 BCE Battle of Siddim
 c. April 16, 1457 BCE Battle of Megiddo

 c. 1290–1279 BCE Seti's military campaigns in Canaan
 c. 1279–1213 BCE Campaigns and Battles of Ramesses II
 First Syrian Campaign
 Second Syrian Campaign
 Third Syrian Campaign

Confederated Tribes of Israel
 c. 1200 BCE the biblical Battle of Gibeah

United Kingdom of Israel and Judah

 c. 1050–1010 BCE Saul, according to the Bible king of the United Kingdom of Israel and Judah, fought in a civil war
 c. 931–913 BCE Rehoboam, according to the Bible king of the Kingdom of Judah, fought the Kingdom of Israel in a civil war

Kingdom of Judah
 925 BCE Sack of Jerusalem an event described in the Bible as sacked by biblical Pharaoh Shishaq, who some identify as Shoshenq I of the Twenty-second Dynasty of Egypt.
 911–605 BCE Campaigns of the
Neo-Assyrian Empire
 701 BCE Siege of Lachish
 701 BCE Assyrian Siege of Jerusalem by Sennacherib
 701 BCE Sennacherib's campaign in Judah
 635 BCE Fall of Ashdod
 601–587 BCE Jewish–Babylonian war
 597 BCE Siege of Jerusalem by Nebuchadnezzar II
 587 BCE Siege of Jerusalem by Nebuchadnezzar II

Babylonian Province of Yehud
 601–587 BCE Jewish–Babylonian war
 597 BCE Siege of Jerusalem by Nebuchadnezzar II
 587 BCE Siege of Jerusalem by Nebuchadnezzar II

Persian Province of Yehud Medinata
 335–323 BCE Wars of Alexander the Great
 October 332 BCE Siege of Gaza

Seleucid Empire
 322–275 BCE Wars of the Diadochi
 312 BCE Battle of Gaza
 219–217 BCE Fourth Syrian War
 June 22, 217 BCE Battle of Raphia
 202–195 BCE Fifth Syrian War
 200 BCE Battle of Panium
 167–160 BCE Maccabean Revolt

Hasmonean Kingdom
 63 BCE Siege of Jerusalem by Pompey the Great, intervening in the Hasmonean civil war on behalf of the Roman Republic.

Herodian Kingdom of Israel
 37 BCE Siege of Jerusalem by Herod the Great, ending Hasmonean rule over Judea.

Roman Tetrarchy of Judea

Roman Province of Judea
 66–136 Jewish–Roman wars
 66–73 First Jewish–Roman War
 70 Siege of Jerusalem by Titus, ending the major phase of the First Jewish–Roman War. It ended in the destruction of Herod's Temple.
 115–117 Second Jewish–Roman War

Roman Province of Syria Palaestina
 66–136 Jewish–Roman wars
 132–136 Third Jewish–Roman War

Byzantine Province of Palaestina Prima
 c. 602–628 Byzantine–Sasanian War
 614–628 Jewish revolt against Heraclius
 614 Siege of Jerusalem by Shahrbaraz (Sasanian general) capturing the city from the Byzantines, part of the Roman-Persian Wars
 Muslim conquests
 629 – c. 1050 Arab–Byzantine wars
 634–638 Muslim conquest of the Levant
 637 Siege of Jerusalem by Khalid ibn al-Walid (Rashidun general) under Umar the Great, capturing the city from the Byzantine Empire

Rashidun Province of Jund Filastin
 637 Siege of Jerusalem by Khalid ibn al-Walid (Rashidun general) under Umar the Great, capturing the city from the Byzantine Empire

Abbasid Province of Jund Filastin
 1099–1291 The Crusades
 1099 First Crusade
 1099 Siege of Jerusalem by the Crusaders, a part of the First Crusade
 1099 Battle of Ascalon

Kingdom of Jerusalem
 1099–1291 The Crusades
 1096–99 First Crusade
 1099 Siege of Jerusalem by the Crusaders, a part of the First Crusade
 1099 Battle of Ascalon
 Inter-Crusade Period
 September 7, 1101 First Battle of Ramla
 May 17, 1102 Second Battle of Ramla
 August 27, 1105 Third Battle of Ramla
 1113 Battle of Al-Sannabra
 1123 Battle of Yibneh

 1145–1149 Second Crusade
 Inter-Crusade Period
 1153 Battle of Ascalon
 November 25, 1177 Battle of Montgisard
 1179 Battle of Jacob's Ford
 July–August 1182 Battle of Belvoir Castle
 September 1183 Battle of Al-Fule
 May 1, 1187 Battle of Cresson
 July 4, 1187 Battle of Hattin
 1187 Siege of Jerusalem
 1189–92 Third Crusade
 1189–91 Siege of Acre
 September 7, 1191 Battle of Arsuf
 August 8, 1192 Battle of Jaffa
 1197 German Crusade
 1212 Children's Crusade
 1217–21 Fifth Crusade
 1218–19 Damietta
 1228–29 Sixth Crusade
 Aftermath of the Sixth Crusade
 1244 Siege of Jerusalem
 October 17–18, 1244 Battle of La Forbie
 1251 Shepherds' Crusade
 Late Crusades Period
 1265 Fall of Caesarea
 1265 Fall of Haifa
 1265 Fall of Arsuf
 April 4 – May 18, 1291 Siege of Acre
 1271–72 Ninth Crusade
 April 4 – May 18, 1291 Siege of Acre
 1260–1300 Mongol raids into Palestine
 September 3, 1260 Battle of Ain Jalut

Ottoman Eyalet of Damascus
 1516–17 Ottoman–Mamluk War
 October 28, 1516 Battle of Yaunis Khan
 May 17, 1805 – March 2, 1848 Campaigns of Muhammad Ali of Egypt
 1834 Arab revolt in Palestine

Ottoman Vilayet of Syria
 July 28, 1914 – November 11, 1918 World War I
 October 29, 1914 – October 30, 1918 Middle Eastern theatre of World War I
 November 17 – December 30, 1917 Battle of Jerusalem
 November 18–24, 1917 Battle of Nebi Samwil
 December 1, 1917 Battle of El Burj
 December 20–21, 1917 Battle of Jaffa

State of Israel
 1948–49 1948 Palestine war
 1948 Siege of Jerusalem
 1951–55 Retribution operations
 1956 Suez War
 1967 Six-Day War
 1967 Encirclement of Jerusalem
 1967–70 War of Attrition
 1973 Yom Kippur War
 1978 South Lebanon conflict
 1982 First Lebanon War
 1982–2000 South Lebanon conflict
 1987–93 First Intifada
 2000–04 Second Intifada
 2006 Second Lebanon War
 2008–09 Gaza War
 2012 Operation Pillar of Defense
 2014 Gaza War

Lebanon
 1279–1213 BCE Campaigns and battles of Ramesses II
 First Syrian campaign
 Second Syrian campaign
 Third Syrian campaign
 1200 BCE Amurru kingdom was destroyed by the Sea Peoples
 1948-1949 Arab-Israeli War
 1958 Lebanon Crisis
 1975–1990 Lebanese Civil War
 1978 Hundred Days' War
 1982-1985 Lebanon War
 1983-1984 Mountain War
 1985-1988 War of the Camps
 1948-ongoing Israeli–Lebanese conflict
 1985-2000 South Lebanon conflict
 2006 2006 Lebanon War
 2007 2007 Lebanon conflict
 2008 2008 conflict in Lebanon
 2010-2012 Arab Spring
 March 15, 2011 – ongoing Syrian Civil War
 2011 – 2019 Spillover of the Syrian Civil War
 June 17, 2011 – 28 August 2017 Syrian Civil War spillover in Lebanon

Saudi Arabia

Muslim conquests
 List of expeditions of Muhammad
 Ridda wars

Rashidun Caliphate
 656–661 First Fitna

Umayyad Caliphate
 680–692 Second Fitna
 743–750 Third Fitna

Abbasid Caliphate
 September 762 – February 763 Alid Revolt

First Saudi state

 1746 Battle of Riyadh
 1764 Battle of Al-Hayer
 1789 Battle of ghrimeel
 1793 Ibn Ufaisan's Invasion
 1793 – 1798 Invasion of Qatar
 April 21 – 1802 or 1801 Invasion of Karbala
 1811 Battle of Khakeekera
 Early 1811 – 1818 Ottoman–Saudi War

Second Saudi state
 1821 – 1824 Rebellion against Egypt Eyalet
 1865 – 1875 Royal Civil War
 1870 – 1871 Al-Hasa Expedition
 1883 Battle of Arwa
 24 January 1891 Battle of Mulayda

Kingdom of Saudi Arabia
 1902–1934 Unification of Saudi Arabia
 13 January 1902 Battle of Riyadh (1902)
 27 January 1903 Battle of Dilam
 1903 – 1907 Saudi–Rashidi War (1903–1907)
 1910 Battle of Hadia
 1913 Conquest of al-Hasa (1913)
 17 January 1915 Battle of Jarrab
 1915 Battle of Kinzaan
 July 1918 – 4 July 1919 First Saudi–Hashemite War
 1919 – 1920 Kuwait-Najd War
 1921 Second Saudi–Rashidi War
 September 1924 – December 1925 Second Saudi-Hashemite War
 1927 – 1930 Ikhwan Revolt
 1934 Saudi–Yemeni War
 1948-1949 1948 Arab–Israeli War
 1962-1970 North Yemen Civil War
 1969 Al-Wadiah War
 1973 Yom Kippur War
 1975-1990 Lebanese Civil War
 1979 Grand Mosque seizure
 1979 1979 Qatif uprising
 1979–1983, 2011–2020 Qatif conflict
 1991 Gulf War
 2009-2010 Operation Scorched Earth
 2014-ongoing Military intervention against ISIL
 2015-ongoing Yemeni Civil War
 2017–2020 Qatif unrest

Syria

Chalcolithic period of Mesopotamia
 c. 3500 BCE Battle at Hamoukar

Akkadian Empire
 c. 2270–2215 BCE (Short chronology) Conquests of Sargon of Akkad

 Akkadian conquest of Ebla

Hittite Empire

 c. 1282 BCE Capture of Kadesh
 Second Syrian campaign of Ramesses II
 Late May 1274 BCE Battle of Kadesh

Neo-Assyrian Empire
 854–846 BCE Assyrian conquest of Aram
 853 BCE Battle of Qarqar

Seleucid Empire
 274–168 BCE Syrian Wars
 274–271 BCE First Syrian War
 260–253 BCE Second Syrian War
 246–241 BCE Third Syrian War
 219–217 BCE Fourth Syrian War
 202–195 BCE Fifth Syrian War
 170–168 BCE Sixth Syrian War

French Mandate of Syria
 1920 Franco-Syrian War
 1925-1927 Great Syrian Revolt
 1945 Levant Crisis

Syrian Arab Republic
 1967 Six-Day War
 1973 Yom Kippur War
 1979-1982 Islamist uprising in Syria
 
 March 15, 2011 – ongoing Syrian Civil War
 April 25 – May 5, 2011 Siege of Daraa
 May 6, 2011 – March 27, 2017 Siege of Homs
 May 7–14, 2011 Siege of Baniyas

Turkey

Hittite Empire
 1650–1600 BCE Conquests of Hattusili I and Mursili I
 1430–1350 BCE Kaska invasions of Hatti

 1260–1240 BCE Trojan War

Kingdom of Diaokhi
 1112 BCE Diaokhi–Assyrian War
 756–741 BCE Diaokhi–Urartian War
 729–722 BCE Colchian–Cimmerian War

Lydian Empire
 May 28, 585 BCE Battle of Halys

Achaemenid Empire
 547 BCE Siege of Sardis
 499–449 BCE Greco-Persian Wars
 499–493 BCE Ionian Revolt
 492–490 BCE First Persian invasion of Greece
 480–478 BCE Second Persian invasion of Greece
 August 27, 479 BCE Battle of Mycale
 477–449 BCE Wars of the Delian League
 466 BCE or 469 BCE Battle of the Eurymedon

Macedonian Empire
 335–323 BCE Wars of Alexander the Great
 May 334 BCE Battle of the Granicus
 334 BCE Siege of Miletus
 334 BCE Siege of Halicarnassus
 November 5, 333 BCE Battle of Issus

Seleucid Empire
 322–275 BCE Wars of the Diadochi
 238–129 BCE Seleucid–Parthian wars

Roman Republic
 192–188 BCE Roman–Syrian War
 92 BCE – 629 CE Roman-Persian Wars
 June 8, 218 CE Battle of Antioch
 260 Battle of Edessa
 344 Siege of Singara
 359 Siege of Amida

Kingdom of Pontus
 88–63 BCE Mithridatic Wars
 88–84 BCE First Mithridatic War
 83–81 BCE Second Mithridatic War
 82 BCE Battle of Halys
 75–63 BCE Third Mithridatic War

Roman Empire
 66–217 Roman-Parthian Wars
 June 53 BCE Battle of Carrhae
 39 BCE Battle of the Cilician Gates
 39 BCE Battle of Amanus Pass

Byzantine Empire

 421–628 Byzantine–Sasanian wars
 421–422 Roman–Sasanian War
 502–506 Anastasian War
 526–532 Iberian War
 572–591 Roman–Persian War
 602–628 Byzantine–Sasanian War
 610 Antioch riots
 613 Battle of Antioch
 610–628 Jewish revolt against Heraclius
 615 Shahin's invasion of Asia Minor
 622 Heraclius' campaign
 602–628 Byzantine assault on Persia
 626 Siege of Constantinople
 627–629 Third Perso-Turkic War
 629–1050s Arab–Byzantine wars
 674–678 Siege of Constantinople
 717–718 Siege of Constantinople
 804–805 Battle of Krasos
 838 Battle of Anzen
 838 Sack of Amorium
 863 Battle of Lalakaon
 John Kourkouas' campaigns
 926–930 First Melitene campaign and conquest of Kalikala
 931–934 Second Malitene campaign
 Sayf al-Dawla campaigns
 944 Conquest of Aleppo
 953 Battle of Marash
 962 Siege of Aleppo

Seljuq Empire
 1048–1308 Byzantine–Seljuq wars
 August 26, 1071 Battle of Manzikert

 1090–1194 Nizari–Seljuk conflicts

Sultanate of Rum
 1095–1099 First Crusade
 July 1, 1097 Battle of Dorylaeum
 1145–1149 Second Crusade
 October 25, 1147 Battle of Dorylaeum
 1048–1308 Byzantine–Seljuq wars
 September 17, 1176 Battle of Myriokephalon
 1207 Siege of Antalya
 1203 Siege of Constantinople
 1204 Siege of Constantinople

Latin Empire
 1204–1261 Bulgarian–Latin wars
 1235 Siege of Constantinople
 Nicaean–Latin Wars
 1260 Siege of Constantinople

Ottoman Empire

 1265–1479 Byzantine–Ottoman Wars
 1265–1328 Rise of the Ottomans
 1328–1341 Byzantium counter
 1331 Siege of Nicaea
 1333–1337 Siege of Nicomedia
 1341–1371 Balkan invasion and civil war
 1371–1394 Byzantine civil war and vassalage
 1394–1424 Resumption of hostilities
 1422 Siege of Constantinople
 1424–1453 Ottoman campaign on Constantinopolis
 April 6, 1453 – May 29, 1453 Fall of Constantinople
 1893 Battle of Al Wajbah
 1893-1908 Macedonian Struggle
 1894 1894 Sasun rebellion
 1894-1897 Hamidian massacres
 1895-1896 Zeitun rebellion (1895–96)
 1897 Greco-Turkish War (1897)
 1903 Theriso revolt
 1903 Ilinden–Preobrazhenie Uprising
 1904 1904 Sasun uprising
 1905 Shoubak revolt of 1905
 1906 Ottoman invasion of Persia (1906)
 1908 Young Turk Revolution
 1909 31 March Incident
 1909-1910 Hauran Druze Rebellion
 1910 Albanian revolt of 1910
 1910 Karak revolt
 1911 Albanian revolt of 1911
 1911-1912 Italo-Turkish War
 1912 Albanian revolt of 1912
 1912-1913 Balkan Wars
 1912-1913 First Balkan War
 1912 Battle of Kumanovo
 1912 Battle of Prilep
 1912 Battle of Monastir
 1912-1913 Siege of Adrianople
 1912-1913 Siege of Scutari
 1913 Second Balkan War
 1914-1918 World War I
 1914-1918 Middle Eastern theatre of World War I
 1914-1918 Caucasus campaign
 1914-1918 Mesopotamian campaign
 1914-1918 South Arabia during World War I
 1914-1918 Persian Campaign
 1915-1918 Sinai and Palestine campaign
 1915-1916 Gallipoli campaign
 1916-1918 Arab Revolt
 1919-1923 Turkish War of Independence
 1918-1922 Franco-Turkish War
 1919-1922 Greco-Turkish War
 1919-1920 [Revolt of Ahmet Anzavur]
 1920 Turkish-Armenian War
 1920 Battle of Geyve
 1920 Konya rebellion

Republic of Turkey
 1921 Kurdish rebellions in Turkey
 1921 Koçgiri rebellion
 1924 Beytussebab rebellion
 1925 Sheikh Said rebellion
 1927-1930 Ararat rebellion
 1937-1938 Dersim rebellion
 1978-ongoing Kurdish–Turkish conflict (1978–present)
 1990-ongoing Serhildan
 2015-ongoing Kurdish–Turkish conflict (2015–present)
 1960 1960 Turkish coup d'état
 1962 February 22, 1962 uprising
 1963 May 20, 1963 uprising
 1969 20 May 1969 coup attempt
 1971 1971 Turkish military memorandum
 1963-1964 Cypriot intercommunal violence
 1972-ongoing Maoist insurgency in Turkey
 1990-present DHKP/C insurgency in Turkey
 1974 Turkish invasion of Cyprus
 1980 1980 Turkish coup d'état
 1997 1997 Turkish military memorandum
 1993-ongoing Turkish government–Gülen movement conflict
 2013 Gezi Park protests
 2016 2016 Turkish coup d'état attempt
 2016 2016–present purges in Turkey

Central Asia

Afghanistan

Ghaznavids
 962 Ghaznavid Empire

Afghan Empires and the Great Game
 1709 Hotaki Empire and Durrani Empire
 The Great Game
Khost rebellion (1856–1857)
Khost rebellion (1912)
Khost rebellion (1924–1925)
Afghan Civil War (1928–1929)
Afghan Civil War (1989–1992)
Afghan Civil War (1992–1996)
Afghan Civil War (1996–2001)
War in Afghanistan (2001–2021)

Russian Empire
 1916–1934 Basmachi movement

Union of Soviet Socialist Republics
 1916–1934 Basmachi movement
 1979–1988 Soviet–Afghan War

Kazakhstan
1068 Battle of the Alta River
1382 Siege of Moscow (1382)
1916-1934 Basmachi movement
1917-1923 Russian Civil War
1917-1920 Alash Orda

Kyrgyzstan
 1898 Andijan uprising of 1898
1916 Central Asian revolt of 1916
1990 Osh riots
1999 Batken Conflict
2005 Tulip Revolution
2010 Kyrgyz Revolution of 2010
2010 2010 South Kyrgyzstan riots

Tajikistan

Dayuan
 104–101 BCE War of the Heavenly Horses

Tajikistan
 1992-1997 Tajikistani Civil War
 2010-2012 Tajikistan insurgency

Turkmenistan
 Seljuk-Ghaznavid Wars
 1040 Battle of Dandanaqan
 1916-1934 Basmachi Movement

Uzbekistan

Sogdia
 335–323 BCE Wars of Alexander the Great
 327 BCE Siege of the Sogdian Rock

Greco-Bactrian Kingdom
 250 BCE Independence
 230 BCE Overthrow of Diodotus II
 210 BCE Seleucid invasion
 180 BCE Expansion into India
 141 BCE Defeats against Parthia

Yuezhi Kingdom
 162 BCE Yuezhi expansion

Indo-Greek Kingdom
 36 BCE Battle of Sogdiana

Kushan Empire
 1st and 2nd Centuries CE Kushan expansion

Rouran Khaganate
 Origin and expansion

Göktürk Khaganate
 Göktürk civil war
 Emperor Taizong's campaign against Eastern Tujue
 Tang campaigns against the Western Turks
 657 Conquest of the Western Turks

Khwarazmian dynasty
 1216–1221 Mongol invasion of Central Asia

Mongol Empire
 1262 Berke–Hulagu war

Timurid dynasty
 1370 Siege of Balkh

Zunghar Khanate
 Conquest of the Tarim Basin and war with the Central Asians

Russian Empire
 The Great Game
 1916–1934 Basmachi movement

Union of Soviet Socialist Republics
 1916–1934 Basmachi movement

Russian Empire
 1916–1934 Basmachi movement

Union of Soviet Socialist Republics
 1916–1934 Basmachi movement
 1979–1988 Soviet–Afghan War

East Asia

China

Longshan culture
 2852–2070 BCE Three Sovereigns and Five Emperors Period
 c. 2500 BCE Battle of Banquan
 c. 2500 BCE Battle of Zhuolu

Xia dynasty
 c. 1628–1600 BCE Rise of Shang
 c. 1600 BCE Battle of Mingtiao

Shang dynasty
 c. 1628–1600 BCE Rise of Shang
 c. 1600 BCE Battle of Mingtiao
 c. 1046 BC\
 c. 1046 BCE Battle of Muye

Zhou dynasty
 c. 1046 BCE Foundation of the Zhou dynasty
 c. 1046 BCE Battle of Muye
 771–476 BCE Spring and Autumn period
 632 BCE Battle of Chengpu
 595 BCE Battle of Bi
 588 BCE Battle of An
 575 BCE Battle of Yanling
 506 BCE Battle of Boju
 4th century BCE Gojoseon–Yan War
 478 BCE Battle of Lize
 475–221 BCE Warring States period
 453 BCE Battle of Jinyang
 353 BCE Battle of Guiling
 342 BCE Battle of Maling
 293 BCE Battle of Yique
 260 BCE Battle of Changping
 230–221 BCE Qin's wars of unification

Qin dynasty
 215 BCE Qin's campaign against the Xiongnu
 214 BCE Qin's campaign against the Yue tribes
 209 BCE Dazexiang Uprising

Han dynasty
 206–202 BCE Chu–Han Contention
 207 BCE Battle of Julu
 205 BCE Battle of Pengcheng
 205 BCE Battle of Jingxing
 203 BCE Battle of Wei River
 202 BCE Battle of Gaixia
 200 BCE Battle of Baideng
 154 BCE Rebellion of the Seven States
 133 BCE – 89 Han–Xiongnu War
 133 BCE Battle of Mayi
 119 BCE Battle of Mobei
 99 BCE Battle of Tian Shan
 67 BCE Battle of Jushi
 36 BCE Battle of Zhizhi
 73 CE Battle of Yiwulu
 89 CE Battle of Ikh Bayan

 2nd century BCE Southward expansion of the Han dynasty
 111 BCE Han–Nanyue War
 109-108 BCE Han-Gojoseon War
 17–25 CE Lülin Rebellion
 23 Battle of Kunyang
 189–220 End of the Han dynasty
 184 Yellow Turban Rebellion
 190 Campaign against Dong Zhuo
 190 Battle of Xingyang
 191 Battle of Yangcheng
 191 Battle of Jieqiao
 191 Battle of Xiangyang
 193 Battle of Fengqiu
 194 Battle of Yan Province
 194 Sun Ce's conquests in Jiangdong
 197 Battle of Wancheng
 198 Battle of Rangcheng
 198 Battle of Xiapi
 199 Battle of Yijing
 199 Campaign against Yuan Shu
 200 Battle of Guandu
 202 Battle of Bowang
 208 Battle of Xiakou
 208 Battle of Changban
 208 Battle to the Southwest of Xiakou
 208 Battle of Red Cliffs
 209 Battle of Jiangling
 211 Battle of Tong Pass
 213 Siege of Jicheng
 213 Battle of Lucheng
 214 Liu Bei's takeover of Yi Province
 215 Battle of Baxi
 215 Battle of Yangping
 217 Battle of Xiaoyao Ford
 218 Battle of Ruxu
 219 Battle of Mount Dingjun
 219 Battle of Han River
 219 Battle of Fancheng
 219 Lü Meng's invasion of Jing Province

Wei dynasty
 220–280 Three Kingdoms
 222 Battle of Xiaoting
 225 Zhuge Liang's Southern Campaign
 Spring 228 – August 234 Zhuge Liang's Northern Expeditions
 228 Battle of Tianshui
 228 Battle of Jieting
 228 Battle of Shiting
 229 Siege of Chencang
 234 Battle of Wuzhang Plains
 227–228 Xincheng Rebellion
 244 Battle of Xingshi
 247–262 Jiang Wei's Northern Expeditions

 255 Battle of Didao
 263 Conquest of Shu by Wei

Jìn dynasty
 220–280 Three Kingdoms
 280 Conquest of Wu by Jin
 291 War of the Eight Princes
 304–439 Sixteen Kingdoms
 304 Wu Hu uprising
 354 Huan Wen's expeditions
 383 Battle of Fei River
 395 Battle of Canhe Slope
 409 Liu Yu's expeditions

Liu Song dynasty
 420–589 Southern and Northern Dynasties
 537 Battle of Shayuan

Sui dynasty
 602 Ly–Sui War
 598–614 Goguryeo–Sui War
 617–621 Transition from Sui to Tang
 617 Battle of Huoyi
 621 Battle of Hulao

Tang dynasty

 629–630 Tang campaign against the Eastern Turks
 630 Battle of Yinshan
 640–657 Tang campaigns against the Western Turks
 640–648 Tang campaign against the oasis states
 640 Conquest of Karakhoja
 644–648 Conquest of Karasahr
 648–649 Conquest of Kucha
 657 Battle of Irtysh River
 657 Conquest of the Western Turks
 645–668 Goguryeo–Tang War
 645 Siege of Yodong
 645 Siege of Ansi
 668 Siege of Pyongyang
 660–663 Baekje-Tang War
 663 Battle of Baekgang
 670 Battle of Dafei River
 698 Battle of Tianmenling
 7th century – 8th century Muslim conquest of Transoxiana
 717 Battle of Aksu
 751 Battle of Talas
 745–749 Siege of Shibao fortress
 December 16, 755 – February 17, 763 An Lushan Rebellion
 756 Battle of Tong Pass
 756 Battle of Yongqiu
 757 Battle of Suiyang
 757 Battle of Xiangjisi
 758–759 Battle of Xiangzhou
 762 Battle of Luoyang
 801–802 Battle of Weizhou
 819 Battle of Yanzhou
 874–884 Huang Chao Rebellion

Song dynasty
 1129–1141 Yue Fei's campaign against Jin
 November 1125 – 13th century Jin–Song Wars
 1161 Battle of Tangdao
 1161 Battle of Caishi
 1235–1279 Song–Yuan wars
 1273 Battle of Xiangyang
 1279 Battle of Yamen

Liao dynasty
 November 15, 976 – May 8, 997 Military campaigns of Emperor Taizong of the Song dynasty
 979–982 First campaign against Liao dynasty
 979 Battle of Gaoliang River
 982–988 Second campaign against Liao dynasty
 986 Chi go Pass Campaign
 February 12, 1101 – March 26, 1125 Reign of Emperor Tianzuo of Liao
 1114–1122 Jurchen invasion
 1123–1125 End of Liao dynasty

Jin dynasty
 1206–1337 Mongol conquests
 1211–1234 Mongol conquest of the Jin dynasty
 1211 Battle of Yehuling
 1215 Battle of Zhongdu

Yuan dynasty

 1351 Red Turban Rebellion
 August 30 – October 4, 1363 Battle of Lake Poyang

Ming dynasty
 1381 Ming conquest of Yunnan
 1300s–1400s Miao Rebellions
 1399–1402 Jingnan Campaign
 1400s–1500s Ming–Turpan conflict
 1406–1407 Ming–Hồ War
 1405–1433 Treasure voyages
 1410 Ming–Kotte War
 1206–1337 Mongol invasions
 1449 Battle of Tumu Fortress
 1510 Prince of Anhua rebellion
 1519 Prince of Ning rebellion
 1521 First Battle of Tamao
 1522 Second Battle of Tamao
 1618–1683 Manchu conquest of China
 1619 Battle of Sarhu
 1626 Battle of Ningyuan
 1640 Battle of Songjin
 1644 Battle of Shanhai Pass
 1633 Battle of the Southern Fujian Sea
 1642 Battle of Nanyang
 1644 Occupied Beijing

Qing dynasty
 1652–1689 Sino–Russian border conflicts
 1674–1681 Revolt of the Three Feudatories
 1683 Battle of Penghu
 1690–1757 First Oirat–Manchu War
 September 3, 1690 Battle of Ulan Butung
 1696 Battle of Zuunmod
 1718 Battle of the Salween River
 1747–1792 Ten Great Campaigns
 1796 White Lotus Rebellion
 1839–1842 First Anglo-Chinese War
 1839 First Battle of Chuenpi
 1840 Capture of Chusan
 1840 Battle of the Barrier
 1841 Second Battle of Chuenpi
 1841 Battle of the Bogue
 1841 Battle of First Bar
 1841 Battle of Whampoa
 March 1841 Battle of Canton
 May 1841 Battle of Canton
 1841 Battle of Amoy
 1841 Capture of Chusan
 1841 Battle of Chinhai
 1842 Battle of Ningpo
 1842 Battle of Tzeki
 1842 Battle of Chapu
 1842 Battle of Woosung
 1842 Battle of Chinkiang
 1851–1864 Taiping Rebellion
 1850 Jintian Uprising
 1853 Battle of Nanjing
 1856 First rout the Army Group Jiangnan
 1858 Battle of Sanhe
 1860 Second rout the Army Group Jiangnan
 1861 Battle of Anqing
 1861 Battle of Guanzhong
 1861 Battle of Shanghai
 1862 Battle of Cixi
 1863 Battle of Suzhou
 1863 Battle of Changzhou
 1864 Third Battle of Nanking
 1864 Hubei Pocket
 1865 Fujian Pocket
 1856–1873 Panthay Rebellion
 1862–1877 Dungan Revolt
 1870 Battle of Ürümqi
 1864–1869 Nien Rebellion
 1867 Battle of Inlon River
 1856–1860 Second Anglo-Chinese War
 1856 Pearl River Forts
 1857 Fatshan Creek
 1858 First Battle of Taku Forts
 1859 Second Battle of Taku Forts
 1860 Third Battle of Taku Forts
 1860 Battle of Palikao
 August 1884 – April 1885 Franco-Chinese War
 1883 Sơn Tây Campaign
 1883 Battle of Paper Bridge
 1884 Bắc Ninh Campaign
 1884 Bắc Lệ ambush
 1884 Battle of Fuzhou
 1884 Kep Campaign
 1884 Keelung Campaign
 1885 Lạng Sơn Campaign
 1885 Battle of Shipu
 1885 Battle of Zhenhai
 1885 Siege of Tuyên Quang
 1885 Battle of Hòa Mộc
 1885 Battle of Bang Bo
 1885 Battle of Phu Lam Tao
 1885 Keelung Campaign
 1885 Pescadores Campaign

 1894–1895 First Sino-Japanese War
 1895 Battle of Weihaiwei
 1895–1896 Dungan Revolt
 1899–1901 Boxer Rebellion
 1900 Battle of Taku Forts
 1900 Battle of Tientsin
 1900 Battle of Shanhaiguan
 1900 Battle of Beicang
 1900 Battle of Yangcun
 1900 Battle of Yingkou
 1900 Battles on Amur River
 1900 Battle of Peking
 1900 Seymour Expedition
 1900 Siege of the International Legations
 February 8, 1904 – 5 September 5, 1905 Russo-Japanese War
 1911–1912 Xinhai Revolution
 1911 Wuchang Uprising

Republic of China
 October 10, 1911 – February 12, 1912 Xinhai Revolution
 1916–1928 Warlord Era
 1926–1928 Northern Expedition
 1927–1950 Chinese Civil War
 September 18, 1931 – February 27, 1932 Japanese invasion of Manchuria
 September 18, 1931 – February 18, 1932 Mukden Incident
 April 1933 – December 1936 Actions in Inner Mongolia
 January 1 – May 31, 1933 Defense of the Great Wall
 July 7, 1937 – September 9, 1945 Second Sino-Japanese War
 September 1, 1939 – 2 September 2, 1945 World War II
 1937–1945 Pacific War
 1942–1945 China Burma India Theater of World War II

People's Republic of China

 1950–1991 Cold War
 1950–1953 Korean War
 1969 Sino–Soviet border conflict
 1967 Chola incident
 1962 Sino-Indian War
 1964 Battle of the Paracel Islands
 1979, 1984 Sino-Vietnamese War
 1987 1987 Sino-Indian skirmish
 1988 Johnson South Reef Skirmish
 Xinjiang Conflict (ongoing)

Japan
 c. 7th century BCE Emperor Jinmu's Expedition
 c. 1st century BCE Takehaniyasuhiko Rebellion
 c. 1st century - early 2nd century Yamato Takeru Expedition
 146-189 or 178-184 Civil War of Wa
 c. 3rd century Empress Jingu Expedition
 391-404 Goguryeo-Yamato Guerra
 463 Kibi Clan Rebellion
 479 Prince Hoshikawa Rebellion
 527-528 Iwai Rebellion
 534 Musashi no Kuni no Miyatsuko Rebellion
 587 Battle of Shigisan
 645 Isshi Incident 
 658-660 Abe's expedition to Hirafu
 August 27–28, 663 Battle of Baekgang
 672 Jinshin Guerra
 720-721 Hayato Rebellion
 740 Fujiwara no Hirotsugu Rebellion
 764 Fujiwara no Nakamaro Rebellion
 774-811 Thirty-Eight Year Guerra
 780-781? Hoki Rebellion
 788 Battle of Subuse
 801 Conquest by Sakanoue in Tamuramaro
 811 Last Conquest by Funya on Watamaro
 878 Gangyo Rebellion
 893 Kanbyo Silla pirate invasion
 936-941 Johei-Tengyo Rebellion
 947 Fujiwara no Koresuke Rebellion
 1019 Toi invasion
 1028-1030 Taira no the Tadatsune Rebellion
 1051-1062 Zenkunen Guerra
 1051 Battle of Onikiribe
 1057 Battle of Kinomi
 1062 Siege of Komatsu
 1062 Siege of Koromogawa
 1062 Siege of Kuriyagawa
 1070 Enkyu Battle of Ezo
 1083-1087 Gosannen Guerra
 1087 Siege of Kanezawa
 1107-1108 Minamoto no Yoshichika Rebellion
 1156 Hogen Rebellion
 1159 Heiji Rebellion
 1180–1185 Genpei War
 1180 Battle of Ishibashiyama
 1180 Battle of Fujigawa
 1181 Battle of Sunomata-gawa
 1183 Battle of Kurikara
 1184 Siege of Hōjūjidono 
 1184 Battle of Uji
 1184 Battle of Awazu
 1184 Battle of Ichi-no-Tani
 1184 Battle of Kojima
 1185 Battle of Yashima
 1185 Battle of Dan-no-ura
 1189 Ōshū War
 1213 Wada Rebellion
 1247 Miura Rebellion
 1221 Jōkyū War
 1221 Battle of Uji
 1274–1281 Mongol invasions of Japan
 1274 Battle of Bun'ei
 1281 Battle of Kōan
 1331-1333 Genkō War
 1331 Siege of Kasagi
 1331 Siege of Akasaka
 1333 Siege of Chihaya
 1333 Battle of Bubaigawara
 1333 Siege of Kamakura
 1335 Nakasendai Rebellion
 1336 Battle of Tatarahama
 1336 Battle of Minatogawa
 1337 Siege of Kanegasaki
 1338 Battle of Ishiku
 1348 Battle of Shijō Nawate
 1350-1352 Incident Kannō 
 1351 Battle of Uchidehama
 1359 Battle of Chikugogawa
 1399 Ōei Rebellion
 1416-1417 Rebellion of Uesugi Zenshū 
 1438-1439 Eikyō Rebellion
 1440 Siege of Yūki 
 1441 Incident Kakitsu
 1456-1457 Koshamain's Revolt
1455-1482 Kyōtoku Incident
1455 Battle of Bubaigawara
1459-1477 Battle of Irako
1476-1480 Nagao Kageharu Rebellion
1477 Battle of Egota-Numabukurohara
 1467 Ōnin War
 1487-1505 Chōkyō Incident
 1504 Battle of Tachigawara
 1506 Battle of Kuzuryūgawa 
 1509 Battle of Nyoigatake
 1510 Battle of Nagamorihara
 1510 Siege of Gongenyama
 1516 Siege of Arai
 1517 Battle of Arita-Nakaide
 1521 Battle of Iidagawara
 1523 Ningbo Turmoil
 1527 Battle of Katsuragawa
 1539 Battle of Tatenawate
 1531 Battle of Shiokawa no gawara
 1531 Kyoroku War
 1531 Battle of Daimotsu
 1532-1535 Tenbun War
 1532 Siege of Iimoriyama
 1532 Siege of Sakai
 1532 Siege of Yamashina Honganji
 1535 Battle of Idano
 1536 Battle of Un no Kuchi
 1536 Battle of Sanbuichigahara
 1536 Hanakura Incident
 1536 Battle of Sendanno
 1536 Battle of Un no kuchi
 1537 Siege of Musashi-Matsuyama
 1538 Battle of Kōnodai 
 1540-1541 Siege of Koriyama
 1542 Battle of Azukizaka
 1542-1543 Siege of Toda Castle
 1542-1548 Utsuro Rebellion
 1546 Battle of Kawagoe
 1546 Battle of Odaihara
 1548 Battle of Azukizaka
 1548 Battle of Uedahara
 1550 Siege of Toishi
 1552 Battle of Kaizu
 1553, 1555, 1557, 1561, 1564 Battles of Kawankajima
 1554 Battle of Enshu-Omori
 1555 Battle of Ino
 1555 Battle of Miyajima
 1556 Battle of Nagaragawa
 1558 Battle of Ukino
 1558 Siege of Terabe
 1564 Battle of Kōnodai 
 1566 Siege of Minowa
 1568 Siege of Hachigata
 1569 Battle of Mimasetoge
 1571 Battle of Takehiro
 1572 Siege of Iwamura Castle
 1578 Battle of Mimigawa
 1584 Battle of Okitanawate
 1589 Battle of Suriagehara
 1467–1573 Sengoku period
 1568–1603 Azuchi–Momoyama period
 1560 Battle of Okehazama
 1575 Battle of Nagashino
 1582 Battle of Yamazaki
 1600 Battle of Sekigahara
 1592–1598 Japanese invasions of Korea
 1592-1593 Battle of Bunroku
 1592 Battle of Hansan Island
 1592 Siege of Busanjin
 1592 Battle of Dadaejin
 1592 Siege of Dongnae
 1592 Battle of Sangju
 1592 Battle of Chungju
 1592 Battle of the Imjin River
 1592 Gangwon campaign
 1593 Battle of Haenju
 1597-1598 Battle of Keicho
 1597 Battle of Myeongnyang
 1597-1598 Siege of Ulsan
 1598 Battle of Sacheon
 1598 Battle of Noryang
1600 Battle of Sekigahara
Siege of Fushimi
Battle of Gifu Castle
Siege of Ueda
1609 Ryukyu's invasion
1614-1615 Siege of Osaka

 1637–1638 Shimabara Rebellion
 1868–1869 Boshin War
 1874 Saga Rebellion
 1876 Shinpūren Rebellion
 1876 Akizuki Rebellion
 1876 Hagi Rebellion
 1877 Satsuma Rebellion
 1894–1895 First Sino-Japanese War
 1894 Battle of Pungdo
 1894 Battle of Seonghwan
 1894 Battle of Pyongyang
 1894 Battle of Yalu River
 1894 Battle of Jiuliancheng
 1894 Battle of Lushunkou
 1895 Battle of Weihaiwei
 1895 Battle of Yingkou
 1895 Japanese invasion of Taiwan
 1895 Campaign Fishermen
 1895 Battle of Keelung
 1895 Hsinchu Campaign
 1895 Battle of Baguashan
 1895 Battle of Chiayi
 1895 Battle of Chiatung
 1895 Capitulation of Tainan
 1895 Battle of Changhsing
 1904-1905 Battle of Port Arthur
 1904 Battle of Yalu River
 1904 Battle of the Yellow Sea
 1904 Battle of Nanshan
 1904 Battle of Shantung
 1904 Battle of Dairen
 1904 Battle of Liaoyang
 1905 Battle of Tsushima
 1905 Battle of Mukden
 1907 Namdaemun Battle
 1914 Siege of Tsingtao
 1920 Battle of Qingshanli
 1920 Battle of Fengwudong
 1937 Marco Polo Bridge Incident
 1937 Battle of Beiping - Tianjin
 1937 Battle of Shanghai
 1937 Battle of Pingxingguan
 1937 Battle of Nanjing
 1937 Battle of Taiyuan
 1937 Battle of Xuzhou
 1938 Battle of Taierzhuang
 1938 Battle of Wuhan
 1938 Battle of Canton
 1939 Battles of Khalkhin Gol (Nomonhan Incident)
 1939 Battle of Changsha
 1940 Offensive of one hundred regiments
 1899–1901 Boxer Rebellion
 1904–1905 Russo-Japanese War
 1914–1918 World War I
 1914 Siege of Tsingtao
 1937–1945 World War II
 1937–1945 Second Sino-Japanese War
 1939–1945 Pacific War
 1938–1945 Soviet-Japanese Border Wars
 1942 Battle of Midway

Korea
 108 BCE Wiman Joseon–Han War
 57 BCE–668 CE Conflicts of Three Kingdoms
 391–413 King Gwanggaeto conquests
 598–614 Goguryeo–Sui War
 612 Battle of Salsu
 645–668 Goguryeo–Tang War
 645 Siege of Yodong
 645 Siege of Ansi
 668 Siege of Pyongyang
 892–936 Conflicts of Later Three Kingdoms
 993–1019 Goryeo–Khitan War
 1104–1107 Jurchen campaigns
 1231–1259 Mongol invasions of Korea
 December 1359 – November 1360 Red Turban invasions of Goryeo
 1396 Second Tsushima Expedition
 1419 Third Tsushima Expedition
 1443 Joseon Northern Expedition
 1510 Sampo Invasion
 1592–1598 Japanese-Korean War (1592–98)
 1592 Siege of Busan
 1592 Siege of Dongnae
 1592 Battle of Sangju
 1592 Battle of Chungju
 1592 Battle of the Imjin River
 1592 Joseon naval campaigns
 1592 Siege of Jinju
 1593 Siege of Haengju
 1597 Battle of Myeongnyang
 1598 Battle of Noryang Point
 1618-1683 Ming-Manchu War
 1627 First Manchurian-Korean War
 1636 Second Manchurian-Korean War
 1866 French campaign against Korea
 1871 United States expedition to Korea
 1875 Ganghwa Island incident
 1882 Imo Incident
 1884 Gapsin Coup
 1894-1895 Donghak Peasant Revolution
 1900 Boxer Rebellion
 1902 Korean Invasion of Manchuria
 1905 Eulsa Righteous War
 1907 Jeungmi Righteous War
 1909 Great Korean Militia Roundup Campaign
1910 Japanese annexation of Korea
1910-1945 Korean Liberation Army And Japanese war
1920 Battle of Fengwudong
1920 Battle of Chongsanli
1921 Massacre of Svobodny
 1945– Korean conflict
 1950–1953 (De jure: 2019) Korean War
 1966–1969 Korean DMZ conflict
 1967– Korean maritime border incidents

Mongolia

Xiongnu 
 215 BCE Qin's campaign against the Xiongnu
 133 BCE – 89 CE Han–Xiongnu War
 60–53 BCE Xiongnu Civil War

Rouran Khaganate
 330–555 Origin and expansion

Turkic Khaganate
 581–593 Göktürk civil war

 626–649 Emperor Taizong's campaign against Eastern Tujue
 640–657 Tang campaigns against the Western Turks
 657 Conquest of the Western Turks

Uyghur Khaganate
 744–848 The rise of Uyghurs in Mongolia

Mongol Empire
 1207 Mongol conquest of Siberia

Golden Horde
 1380–1390 Tokhtamysh–Timur war
 1206–1337 Mongol invasions
 Tatar invasions
 1938–1945 World War II
 1938–39 Soviet–Japanese border conflicts
 1945 Soviet invasion of Manchuria

Taiwan (Republic of China)
 1635-1636 Dutch pacification campaign on Formosa
 1652 Guo Huaiyi Rebellion
 1661 Siege of Fort Zeelandia
 1683 Battle of Penghu
 1787–1788 Ten Great Campaigns
 1895 Japanese conquest of Taiwan
 1947 February 28 Incident

South Asia

Bangladesh
 1303 Conquest of Sylhet
 1512–1516 Bengal Sultanate–Kingdom of Mrauk U War
 1576 Battle of Rajmahal 
 1611 Conquest of Bakla
 1665 Conquest of Chittagong
 1757 Battle of Plassey

People's Republic of Bangladesh
 1971 Bangladesh Liberation War
 Operation Searchlight
 Operation Hotel Intercontinental
 1971 Bangladesh genocide
 1971 Indo-Pakistani War
 Liberation of Mirpur
 Battle of Gazipur
 Battle of Sylhet
 Battle of Boyra
 1972-1975 Communist insurgency
 15 August 1975 Bangladesh coup d'état
 3 November 1975 Bangladesh coup d'état
 7 November 1975 Bangladesh coup d'état
 1977 Bogra mutiny
 1977 Air Force mutiny
 1977-1997 Chittagong Hill Tracts conflict
 1991-1992 Operation Clean and Beautiful Nation
 1994 Ansar mutiny
 1996 coup d'état attempt
 1998 coup d'état
 2001 Indo-Bangla border skirmish
 2004 10-Truck Arms and Ammunition Haul
 2006–2008 Bangladeshi political crisis
 2008 Myanmar naval standoff
 2009 Bangladesh Rifles revolt
 2011 coup d'état attempt
 2015 Arakan Army border clash

Bhutan
 1766–1788 Ten Great Campaigns

India

Bharathvarsha
 c. 15000 BCE Ramayana War
 c. 5300 BCE – Kurukshetra War

Bharat
 c. 1700 BCE – c. 1000 BCE Battle of the Ten Kings
 543–504 BCE Vijaya's conquest of Sri Lanka

Kingdom of Magadha
 500–321 BCE Kingdom of Magadha conflicts
 323–298 BCE Chandragupta Maurya's conquests
 265–264 BCE Kalinga War
 424–321 BCE Nanda Empire conflicts
 424–321 BCE Nanda Dynasty conflicts
 321–320 BCE Conquest of the Nanda Empire

Maurya Empire
 265-264 BCE Kalinga war

Indo-Scythian Kingdom
 320–550 Gupta Empire conflicts

Gupta Empire
 320–550 Gupta Empire conflicts

Empire of Harsha
 606–647 Empire of Harsha Conflicts

Delhi Sultanate
 1206–1451 Delhi Sultanate conflicts
 1206–1337 Mongol conquests
 1221–1308 Mongol invasions of India
 Spring 1221 Battle of Indus
 December 20, 1305 Battle of Amroha

Vijaynagara Empire
1336–1646 Vijayanagara Empire conflicts
 1520 Battle of Raichur
 1565 Battle of Talikota

Mughal Empire
 1526–1757 Mughal Empire conflicts
 1526 First Battle of Panipat
 1527 Battle of Khanwa
 1556 Second Battle of Panipat
 1615–82 Ahom–Mughal conflicts
 1649–53 Mughal–Safavid War
 1739 Battle of Karnal

Maratha Empire
 1681-1707 Mughal-Maratha Wars
 1737-1758 Maratha conquests of North and Northwest India
 1777–1818 Anglo-Maratha Wars
 1780-1787 Maratha-Mysore Wars

Sikh Empire
 1799–1849 Sikh Empire conflicts
 1708 Battle of Chamkaur
 1700 First Battle of Anandpur
 1687 Battle of Nadaun
 1897 Battle of Saragarhi
 1701–1704 Second Battle of Anandpur
 September 18, 1688 Battle of Bhangani
 1837 Battle of Jamrud
 1841–1842 Sino-Sikh war
 1855–1856 Nepalese–Tibetan War

Company rule in India
 1766–1799 Anglo-Mysore Wars
 1766–1769 First Anglo-Mysore War
 1780–1784 Second Anglo-Mysore War
 1789–1792 Third Anglo-Mysore War
 1798–1799 Fourth Anglo-Mysore War
 1777–1818 Anglo-Maratha Wars
 1777–1783 First Anglo-Maratha War
 1803–1805 Second Anglo-Maratha War
 1817–1818 Third Anglo-Maratha War
 1799–1802 Polygar Wars
 1814–1816 Gurkha War
 1816–1826 Burmese invasions of Assam
 1845–1849 British Empire conflicts
 1845 Battle of Mudki
 1845 Battle of Ferozeshah
 1846 Battle of Aliwal
 February 10, 1846 Battle of Sobraon
 1848 Battle of Ramnagar
 1849 Battle of Chillianwala
 1849 Battle of Gujrat
 1849 Siege of Multan
 1857 Indian Rebellion/Indian Mutiny
 1857 Siege of Delhi
 1857 Siege of Cawnpore
 1857 Siege of Lucknow
 1857 Battle of Jhelum
 1857 Siege of Arrah
 1858 Jhansi

British Raj
 18231886 Anglo-Burmese wars
 18231826 First Anglo-Burmese War
 18521853 Second Anglo-Burmese War
 18851886 Third Anglo-Burmese War
 18391860 Opium Wars
 18391848 First Opium War
 18561860 Second Opium War
 18971898 Tirah Campaign
 1919Third Anglo-Afghan War
 18411842 Sino-Sikh War
 18451849 Anglo-Sikh Wars
 18451846 First Anglo-Sikh War
 18481849 Second Anglo-Sikh War
 1888 Sikkim Expedition
 18971898 Tirah Campaign
 Indian independence movement
 1905 Partition of Bengal
 19051947 Revolutionary movement for Indian independence
 19141918 World War I
 1919 Jallianwala Bagh massacre
 19201935 Non-cooperation movement
 19391945 World War II
 19391945 India in World War II
 19411945 South-East Asian theatre of World War II
 19421945 China Burma India Theater of World War II
 19421945 Battles and operations of the Indian National Army
 19421945 Battles and operations of the Indian National Army
 19421947 Quit India Movement

Dominion of India
 1947 Partition of India
 October 22, 1947 – January 1, 1948 Indo-Pakistani War
 September 13–18, 1948 Operation Polo

Republic of India
 1961 Operation Vijay
 1962 Sino-Indian War
 1964 – ongoing Insurgency in Northeast India
 1965 Indo-Pakistani War
 1967 – ongoing Naxalite-Maoist insurgency
 March 26 – December 16, 1971 Bangladesh Liberation War
 1971 Indo-Pakistani War
 1984 Siachen conflict
 1984 Operation Meghdoot
 1984 Operation Blue Star
 1984 Operation Woodrose
 1987–1990 Indian intervention in the Sri Lankan Civil War
 1987 Operation Pawan
 1988 Operation Viraat
 1988 Operation Trishul
 1988 Operation Checkmate
 1989 – ongoing Insurgency in Jammu and Kashmir
 1999 Kargil War

Nepal
 1790–1792 Ten Great Campaigns
 1814–1816 Anglo-Nepalese War
 1855–1856 Nepalese–Tibetan War
 1996–2006 Nepal Civil War

Pakistan
 535 BCE Persian Invasion 
 326 BCE Alexander the Great's Conquests 
 305-303 BCE Seleucid-Maurya War 
 711 Umayyad Invasion
 1001 Ghaznavid Invasion
 1306 Mongol Invasion 
 1526 Mughal Conquests 
 1747 Durrani Invasion
 1838- 1845 Anglo Sikh Wars
 1839-1919 Anglo-Afghan Wars
 1947 Partition of India
 Indo-Pakistani wars and conflicts
 1947 Indo-Pakistani War
 1965 Indo-Pakistani War
 1971 Indo-Pakistani War
 1984 Siachen conflict
 1999 Kargil War
 1971 Bangladesh Liberation War
 March 26 – May 25, 1971 Operation Searchlight
 1971 Bangladesh atrocities
 1971 Indo-Pakistani War
 1999 Pakistani coup d'état
 2004 – ongoing War in Waziristan
 2004 – ongoing Balochistan conflict
 2007 Pakistani state of emergency

Sri Lanka
 161 or 162 BCE Battle of Vijithapura
 862 Anuradhapura invasion of Pandyan
 1165-1181 Polonnaruwa-Pagan war
 1169-1177 Pandyan civil war
 1020–1130 Medieval Chola Invasions
 1410 or 1411 Ming-Kotte War
 1527-1658 Sinhalese-Portuguese war
 1557-1558 Siege of Kotte
 1559 Battle of Mulleriyawa
 1560-1621 Portuguese conquest of the Jaffna kingdom
 1594 Campaign of Danture
 1638 Battle of Gannoruwa
 1796 East India Company conquest
 1803–1815 Kandyan Wars
 1818 Uva-Wellassa Rebellion
 1848 Matale Rebellion
 1914–1948 Sri Lankan independence movement
 1971 JVP Insurrection (Sri Lanka)
 1983–2009 Sri Lankan Civil War
 1976–1987 Eelam War I
 1987–1989 JVP insurrection (Sri Lanka)
 1990–1995 Eelam War II
 1995–2002 Eelam War III
 2006–2009 Eelam War IV

Southeast Asia

Burma
 1020–1130 Medieval Chola Invasions
 1548–1549 Burmese–Siamese War
 1765–1769 Sino-Burmese War
 1816–1826 Burmese invasions of Assam
 Anglo-Burmese wars
 1823–1826 First Anglo-Burmese War
 1852–1853 Second Anglo-Burmese War
 1885–1886 Third Anglo-Burmese War
 1939–1945 World War II
 1941–1945 South-East Asian theatre of World War II
 1942–1945 Japanese occupation of Burma
 1942–1945 China Burma India Theater of World War II
 1948 – ongoing Internal conflict in Burma
 2007 – Burmese anti-government protests

Cambodia

Kingdom of Funan
 c. 100 Preah Thaong and Neang Neak conflict

Chenla Kingdom
 Apex and decline of Funan

Khmer Empire

 1020–1130 Medieval Chola invasions

French Indochina
 1945–1954 First Indochina War
 1967–1975 Cambodian Civil War
 1957–1975 Vietnam War
 1978–1989 Cambodian–Vietnamese War
 1978–1988 Vietnamese border raids in Thailand
 1997 Clashes in Cambodia
 2008 – ongoing Cambodian–Thai border dispute

Indonesia
 1020–1130 Medieval Chola invasions
 1293 Mongol invasion of Java
 1704-1708 First Javanese War of Succession
 1719-1722 Second Javanese War of Succession
 1749-1755 Third Javanese War of Succession
 1945–1949 Indonesian National Revolution
 1962–1966 Indonesia–Malaysia confrontation
 1975–1999 Indonesian Invasion of East Timor
 1969–present Indonesian West Papua Conflict
 1976–2005 Insurgency in Aceh

Laos
 1957–1975 Vietnam War
 1975–2008 Conflict in Laos involving the Hmong

Malaysia
 1020–1130 Medieval Chola Invasions
 1786 Honourable East India Company conquest
 1939–1945 World War II
 1941–1942 Malayan Campaign
 1948–1960 Malayan Emergency
 1962–1966 Indonesia–Malaysia confrontation
 1968–1989 Communist insurgency in Malaysia
 2013 Lahad Datu standoff

Philippines
 900–1565 Precolonial period
 1521 Battle of Mactan
 1896–1898 Philippine Revolution
 1898 Spanish–American War
 1898 Battle of Manila Bay
 1898–1913 Philippine–American War
 World War II
 1942 Battle of Bataan
 1944 Battle of Surigao Strait
 1944 Battle off Samar
 1944 Battle of Mindoro
 1944 Battle of Luzon
 1944 Battle of the Philippine Sea
 1944 Battle of Leyte
 1945 Battle of Manila
 1945 Battle of Mindanao
 1945 Battle of Corregidor
 1945 Invasion of Lingayen Gulf
 1946–1954 Hukbalahap Rebellion
 1969–ongoing Communist rebellion in the Philippines
 1969–2019 Islamic insurgency in the Philippines
 2013 Zamboanga City crisis
 2017 Battle of Marawi
 2002–2015 Operation Enduring Freedom – Philippines
1965–1986 Under Marcos

Thai Cambodia border Conflict

Thailand
 1020–1130 Medieval Chola Invasions
 1548–1855 Burmese–Siamese wars
 1548 Burmese–Siamese War Toungoo–Ayutthaya
 1759–1760 Burmese–Siamese War Konbaung–Ayutthaya
 1775–1776 Burmese–Siamese War Konbaung–Bangkok
 1939–1945 World War II
 1940–1941 French-Thai War
 1940–1941 Japanese invasion of Thailand
1966-1974 Thailand during the Vietnam war
 1978-1989 3rd Indochina war
 1978 Thai–Laotian Border War
 1978 - 1984 Vietnamese border raids on Thailand
 2008-2011 Thai-Cambodia border disputeThai Cambodia border Conflict
 2004 – ongoing South Thailand insurgency

Vietnam
 258–257 BCE Thuc–Lac Viet War
 217–207 BCE Thuc–Qin War
 111 BCE Trieu–Han War
 39, 40–43 CE Trưng Sisters' Uprising, 137–138, 156–160, 178–181, 248, 299–319, 319–323, 468–485, 542–544, 548–570, 687, 722, 791–798, 803, 819–820, 905 Uprising wars against Chinese domination
 938–939 Ngô Quyền war of independence
 966–968 War between the 12 warlords
 981 War against the Song dynasty
 1075–1077 War against the Song dynasty
 1257–58, 1284–85, 1287–88 Mongol invasions of Vietnam
 982, 1312, 1372, 1377, 1388, 1446–1471, 1695, 1796 Viet-Champa wars
 1407–1427 War against the Ming dynasty
 1553–1592 Lê–Mạc civil war
 1627–1673 Trịnh–Nguyễn War
 1714–1755 Nguyen–Khmer War
 1788–1789 Qing–Tây Sơn War
 1784–1785 Tây Sơn-Siam War
 1858–1885 French–Nguyễn war
 1914–1918 First World War
 Vietnam during the First World War
 1940–1945 Second World War
 Vietnam during the Second World War
 1946–1954 First Indochina War
 1954–1975 Vietnam War
 1974 Battle of the Paracel Islands
 1975–1989 Cambodian–Vietnamese War
 1979 Sino-Vietnamese War
 1979–1988 Vietnamese border raids in Thailand
 1979–1990 Sino-Vietnamese border conflict
 1988 Johnson South Reef Skirmish

Asia-Pacific
 1845–1872 New Zealand Wars
 1855 Battle of Kaba
 1878-1888 Nauruan Civil War
 1886–1894 Samoan Civil War
 1887–1889 Samoan crisis
 1898–1899 Second Samoan Civil War
 1910-1911 Sokehs rebellion
 1914–1918 World War I 
 1914 Battle of Bita Paka
 1914 Australian occupation of German New Guinea
 1937–1945 World War II
 1942-1943 Guadalcanal campaign
 1942-1945 New Guinea campaign
 1942-1945 Solomon Islands campaign
 1985 Sinking of the Rainbow Warrior
 1987 1987 Fijian coups d'état
1988–1998 Bougainville Civil War
1998–2003 Solomon Islands Civil War
 2003–2017 Regional Assistance Mission to Solomon Islands
2000 2000 Fijian coup d'état
2005–2006 2005–2006 Fijian political crisis
 2006 Fijian military unrest in 2006
 2006 Fijian coup d'état
2009 2009 Fijian constitutional crisis

North Asia

Russia

Grand Duchy of Moscow
 1368-1372 Lithuanian-Muscovite War
 1376 Muscovite-Volga Bulgars War
 Battle on Pyana River
 Battle of the Vozha River
 Battle of Kulikovo
1382 Siege of Moscow
 1438–1552 Russo-Kazan Wars
 1467-1469 Qasim War
 1471 Battle of Shelon
 1480 Great stand on the Ugra River
 1478 Siege of Kazan
 1492-1494 First Muscovite-Lithuanian War
 1495-1497 Russo-Swedish War
 1500-1503 Second Muscovite-Lithuanian War
 1507-1508 Third Muscovite-Lithuanian War
 1512-1522 Fourth Muscovite-Lithuanian War
 1534-1537 Fifth Muscovite-Lithuanian War

Tsardom of Russia
 1552 Siege of Kazan
 1552-1556 Tatar Rebellion
 1554-1557 Ivan the Terrible's Swedish War
 1556 Russian conquest of Astrakhan
 1558-1583 Livonian War
 1568-1570 Astrakhan Expedition
 1571 Russo-Crimean War
 July 1580 – 1639 Russian conquest of Siberia

 July 1580 – 1598 Conquest of the Khanate of Sibir
 October 23, 1582 Battle of Chuvash Cape
 1590-1595 Russo-Swedish War
 1605-1618 Polish-Russian War
 1606-1607 Bolotnikov Rebellion
 1610-1617 Ingrian War
 1632-1634 Smolensk War
 1651-1653 Russo-Persian War
 1652–1689 Sino-Russian border conflicts
 1654-1667 First Northern War
 1656-1658 Russo-Swedish War
 1662-1664 First Bashkir Rebellion
 1670-1671 Razin's Rebellion
 1676-1681 Russo-Turkish War
 1683-1700 Great Turkish War
 1700-1721 Great Northern War
 1704-1711 Third Bashkir Rebellion
 1707-1708 Bulavin Rebellion
 1717 Peter the Great's Khivan War
 1717-1847 Kazakh-Russian conflicts

Russian Empire

 1722-1723 Russo-Persian War
 1733-1738 War of Polish Succession
 1735-1739 Russo-Turkish War
 1735-1740 Fourth Bashkir Rebellion
 1740-1748 War of the Austrian Succession
 1756-1763 Seven Years' War
 1768-1769 Koliivshchyna Rebellion
 1768-1772 War of the Bar Confederation
 1768-1774 Russo-Turkish War
 1773-1775 Pugachev's Rebellion
 1787-1792 Russo-Turkish War
 1788-1790 Russo-Swedish War
 1792 Polish-Russian War 
 1794 Kościuszko Uprising
 1796 Persian Expedition of Catherine the Great
 1799-1802 War of the Second Coalition
 1803-1806 War of the Third Coalition
 1804-1813 Russo-Persian War
 1806-1807 War of the Fourth Coalition
 1806-1812 Russo-Turkish War
 1807-1812 Anglo-Russian War
 1808-1809 Finnish War
 1809 War of the Fifth Coalition
 1812 French invasion of Russia
 1813-1814 War of the Sixth Coalition
 1815 War of the Seventh Coalition
 1817-1864 Caucasian War
 1825 Decembrist Revolt
 1826-1828 Russo-Persian War
 1827 Battle of Navarino
 1828-1829 Russo-Turkish War
 1830-1831 November Uprising
 1839-1841 Second Egyptian-Ottoman War
 1839-1895 Russian conquest of Central Asia
 1841 Gurian Rebellion
 1842 Shoorcha Rebellion
 1848-1849 Hungarian Revolution
 1853-1856 Crimean War
 1858 Mahtra War
 1861 Bezdna Revolt
 1863-1864 January Uprising
 1866 Siberian Uprising
 1877-1878 Russo-Turkish War
 1897-1898 Cretan Revolt
 1899-1901 Boxer Rebellion
 1904–1905 Russo-Japanese War
 January 22, 1905 – June 16, 1907 Revolution of 1905
 July 28, 1914 – November 11, 1918 World War I
 February–October 1917 Russian Revolution
 February 1917 February Revolution
 July 1917 July Days
 October 1917 October Revolution
 November 7, 1917 – October 25, 1922 Russian Civil War

Russian Republic
 November 7, 1917 – October 25, 1922 Russian Civil War

Union of Soviet Socialist Republics
 1939–1945 World War II
 1938–1939 Soviet–Japanese border conflicts
 1945 Soviet invasion of Manchuria
 1945–1991 Cold War
 1969 Sino-Soviet border conflict

Russian Federation
 1991-ongoing Kuril Islands dispute
 (1994-1996),(1999-2010) Chechen Wars
 (2022- present) Russia Invaded Ukraine

Chronological list of wars

20th century
 1904–1905 Russo-Japanese War
 1911 Wuchang Uprising
 1914–1918 World War I
 1919 Third Anglo-Afghan War
 1919 May Fourth Movement
 1920 Zhili–Anhui War
 1920–1921 Guangdong–Guangxi War
 1922 First Zhili–Fengtian War
 1924 Second Zhili–Fengtian War
 1926–1928 Kuomintang – Warlords conflict
 1927–1936 Chinese Civil War
 1929 Sino-Soviet War
 1929 Afghan civil war
 1937–1945 Second Sino-Japanese War
 1939–1945 World War II
 1939–1945 Indian Ocean conflict
 1940 Japanese coup d'état in French Indochina
 1940–1941 Franco-Thai War
 1941 Japanese invasion of Thailand
 1941 Anglo-Soviet invasion of Iran
 1941–1942 Japanese invasion of Philippines
 1941–1942 Japanese invasion of Malaya
 1941–1942 Japanese invasion of Dutch Indies
 1942–1945 New Guinea campaign
 1942–1945 Burma Campaign
 1944–1945 Allied invasion of Philippines
 1944–1945 Japan campaign
 1945 Japanese coup d'état in French Indochina
 1945 British invasion of Malaya and Singapore
 1945 Borneo campaign
 1945 Soviet invasion of Manchuria
 1946–1950 Chinese Civil War
 1946–1954 First Indochina War
 1947 Indo-Pakistani War of 1947
 1950 Chinese invasion of Tibet
 1950–1953 Korean War
 1951–1954 Abadan Crisis
 1954–1955 First Taiwan Strait Crisis
 1958 Second Taiwan Strait Crisis
 1959 Tibetan uprising
 1959–1975 Vietnam War
 1962 Sino-Indian War
 1964 – today Manipur conflict
 1965 Indo-Pakistani War of 1965
 1967 – today Naxalite–Maoist insurgency
 1969 Sino-Soviet border conflict
 1970–1995 Punjab insurgency
 1971 Indo-Pakistani War of 1971
 1971 Maoist rebellion in Sri Lanka
 1978–1979 Cambodian–Vietnamese War
 1979 – today Assam conflict
 1979–1989 Soviet–Afghan War
 1979–1998 Khmer Rouge insurgency
 1979 Sino-Vietnamese War
 1980 Coconut War
 1983–2009 Sri Lankan Civil War
 1984 Siachen conflict
 1984 Operation Blue Star
 1987–1988 Thai–Laotian Border War
 1987 Fijian coups d'état
 1988-1994 First Nagorno-Karabakh War
 1988-1998 Bougainville Civil War
 1989 – today Insurgency in Jammu and Kashmir
 1989 Tiananmen protests
 1989 – today Tripura rebellion
 1989–1992 Mujahideen – Communist war in Afghanistan
 1992–1996 Taliban takeover of Afghanistan
 1992–1997 Tajikistani Civil War
 1993 – today Ethnic conflict in Nagaland
 1995–1996 Third Taiwan Strait Crisis
 1996–2001 Taliban–Northern Alliance conflict
 1998–2001 Islamic insurgency in Uzbekistan
 1998-2003 Solomon Islands Civil War
 1999 Kargil War

21st century

 2000-2001 Fijian coup d'état
 2001 Bangladeshi-Indian border skirmish
 2001 – 2021 War on Terror
 2001 – 2021 Afghanistan War
 2002 – 2015 Operation Enduring Freedom – Philippines
 2002 – today Islamic terrorism in Indonesia
 2002 – today Islamic insurgency in Xinjiang
 2004 – today War in North-West Pakistan
 2004 – today South Thailand insurgency
 2003–2004 Operation All Clear
 2005 Islamic uprising in Uzbekistan
 2005–2006 Fijian political crisis
 2006 Fijian military unrest 
 2006 Fijian coup d'état
 2009 Fijian constitutional crisis
 2008–2009 Cambodian-Thai stand-off
 2010 Uruzgan helicopter attack
 2010 – 2022 Nagorno-Karabakh conflict
 2010 Nagorno-Karabakh clashes
 2010 Mardakert clashes
 2012 Armenian–Azerbaijani border clashes
 2014 Armenian–Azerbaijani clashes
 2016 Armenian–Azerbaijani clashes
 2016 Nagorno-Karabakh conflict
 2018 Armenian–Azerbaijani clashes
 2020 Armenian–Azerbaijani clashes
 2020 Nagorno-Karabakh war
 2021–2022 Armenia–Azerbaijan border crisis
 2015 - today Islamic State-Taliban conflict
 2016 India–Pakistan military confrontation
 2016 – 2017 Kashmir unrest
 2022 - today Republican insurgency in Afghanistan

See also
 List of conflicts in North America
 List of conflicts in Central America
 List of conflicts in South America
 List of conflicts in Europe
 List of conflicts in Africa
 List of conflicts in the Near East
 List of conflicts in the Middle East
 List of conflicts in Australia
 List of wars

Conflicts
History of Asia
Military history of Asia
Asia